= Prometheism =

Polish political project to divide the Russian Empire and the Soviet Union

Prometheism or Prometheanism (Polish: Prometeizm) was a political project initiated by Józef Piłsudski, a principal statesman of the Second Polish Republic from 1918 to 1935. Its aim was to weaken the Russian Empire and then the Soviet Union, by supporting nationalist independence movements among the major non-Russian peoples that lived within the borders of Russia and the Soviet Union.

Between the World Wars, Prometheism and Piłsudski's other concept, that of an "Intermarium federation", constituted two complementary geopolitical strategies for him and for some of his political heirs.

== Sources of Prometheism ==
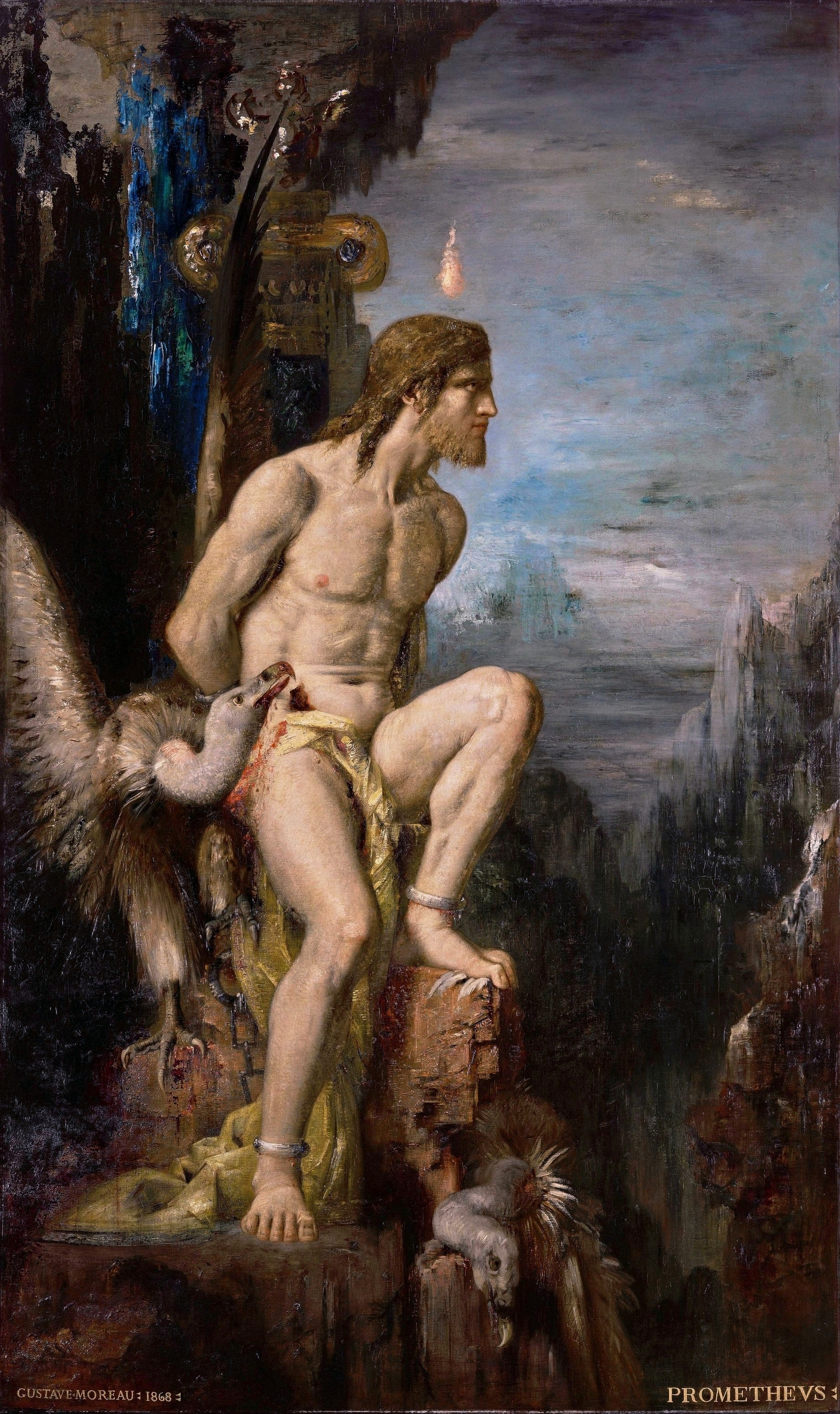
Prometheus, by Gustave Moreau, tortured on Mount Caucasus

Piłsudski's elaboration of Prometheism had been aided by an intimate knowledge of the Russian Empire gained while he was exiled by its government to eastern Siberia. The term "Prometheism" was suggested by the Greek myth of Prometheus, whose gift of fire to mankind, in defiance of Zeus, came to symbolize enlightenment and resistance to despotic authority.

A brief history of Poland's Promethean endeavor was set down on February 12, 1940, by Edmund Charaszkiewicz, a Polish military intelligence officer whose responsibilities from 1927 until the outbreak of World War II in Europe in September 1939 had included the coordination of Poland's Promethean program. Charaszkiewicz wrote his paper in Paris after escaping from a Poland overrun by Nazi Germany.

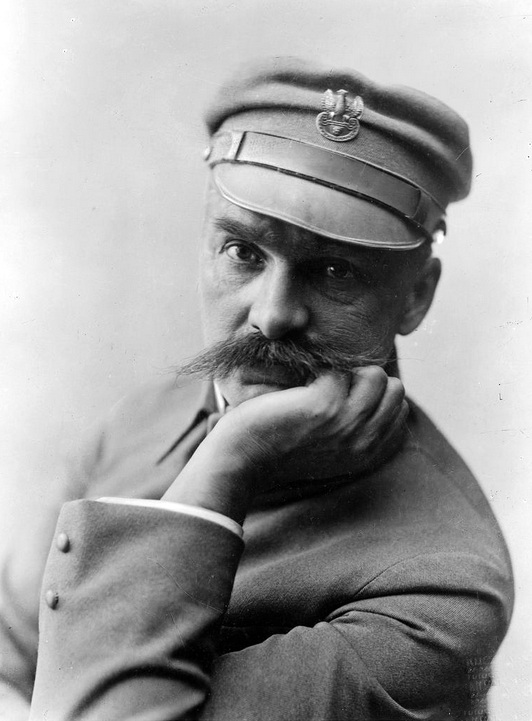
Józef Piłsudski—father of the Promethean strategy

The creator and soul of the Promethean concept [wrote Charaszkiewicz] was Marshal Piłsudski, who as early as 1904, in a memorandum to the Japanese government, pointed out the need to employ, in the struggle against Russia, the numerous non-Russian nations that inhabited the basins of the Baltic, Black and Caspian Seas, and emphasized that the Polish nation, by virtue of its history, love of freedom, and uncompromising stance toward [the three empires that had partitioned Poland out of political existence at the end of the 18th century] would, in that struggle, doubtless take a leading place and help work the emancipation of other nations oppressed by Russia.

A key excerpt from Piłsudski's 1904 memorandum declared:

Poland's strength and importance among the constituent parts of the Russian state embolden us to set ourselves the political goal of breaking up the Russian state into its main constituents and emancipating the countries that have been forcibly incorporated into that empire. We regard this not only as the fulfilment of our country's cultural strivings for independent existence, but also as a guarantee of that existence, since a Russia divested of her conquests will be sufficiently weakened that she will cease to be a formidable and dangerous neighbor.

The Promethean movement, according to Charaszkiewicz, took its genesis from a national renaissance that began in the late 19th century among many peoples of the Russian Empire. That renaissance stemmed from a social process that led in Russia to revolution. Nearly all the socialist parties created in the ethnically non-Russian communities assumed a national character and placed independence at the tops of their agendas: this was so in Poland, Ukraine, Finland, Latvia, Lithuania, Georgia and Azerbaijan. These socialist parties would take the lead in their respective peoples' independence movements. While all these countries harbored organizations of a purely national character that likewise championed independence, the socialist parties, precisely because they associated the fulfilment of their strivings for independence with the social movement in Russia, showed the greater dynamism. Ultimately the peoples of the Baltic Sea basin—Poland, Finland, Estonia, Latvia and Lithuania—won and, until World War II, all kept their independence. The peoples of the Black and Caspian Sea basins—Ukraine, Don Cossacks, Kuban, Crimea, Georgia, Azerbaijan, Armenia, Northern Caucasus—emancipated themselves politically in 1919–1921 but then lost their independence to Soviet Russia during the Russian Civil War.

In 1917–1921, according to Charaszkiewicz, as the nations of the Baltic, Black and Caspian Sea basins were freeing themselves from Russia's tutelage, Poland was the only country that worked actively together with those peoples. In these efforts, Poland met with opposition from the western coalition; the latter backed the (anticommunist) White Russians in their endeavor to rebuild the erstwhile Russian Empire. At the same time, according to Charaszkiewicz, Germany, with her occupation forces, strengthened her influences in Lithuania and Latvia, manipulated Ukraine's Lt. Gen. Pavlo Skoropadsky toward Ukrainian federation with a possible future non-Bolshevik Russia, and attempted a German hegemony in the Caucasus against the political interests of Germany's ally, Turkey. According to Charaszkiewicz, Germany's true intentions were at last made manifest in the Treaty of Brest-Litovsk, concluded with the Bolsheviks in 1918.

However, the secret organisation Aufbau established in Munich in 1920 by a section of the white Russian émigrés in Germany developed far-ranging plans that had similar aims to the Promethean movement, only aligned with the economic interests of Germany in the east. Aufbau's chief political allies were Erich Ludendorff and Adolf Hitler as the leaders of the incipient Nazi movement. Aufbau sought to overthrow the Bolshevik government through military intervention and to break up Bolshevik Russia into a number of National Socialist successor states, including the Ukraine-led Black Sea League, similar entities in the Baltic and Siberia, and a rump Russia. The Ukrainian representative in Aufbau was Ivan Poltavets'-Ostrianytsia, former chancellor of the anti-Bolshevik Ukrainian State, head of the Ukrainian National Cossack Organization. In 1921 Aufbau secured two million marks of funding for Vasyl Vyshyvanyi's army in return for trading and industrial concessions to Germany in the future Ukrainian state and recruitment began, while Poltavets'-Ostrianytsia joined Vyshyvanyi's Supreme Council in Vienna. An offensive in Ukraine was to be combined with a new undertaking in the Baltics along the lines of the 1919 Latvian Intervention by the West Russian Volunteer Army of Pavel Bermondt-Avalov. A Russian nationalist coup against the "Jews" (i.e. the Bolsheviks) to establish a "Russian national farmers' dictatorship" was planned for the summer of 1923 under the leadership of Vasily Biskupsky and Pyotr Krasnov. By 1923, the Munich leader of the Military Organization of Eastern Galicia, Bohdan Hustevych, was receiving military training from Ernst Röhm, and Poltavets'-Ostrianytsia proclaimed that the "time of a productive National Socialist revolution ... has drawn near". The plans were thwarted financially by the internal divisions within the White Russian emigration, as the Supreme Monarchical Council of Nikolai Markov favoured a Great Russian restoration with French backing, and refused to work with either Bermondt-Avalov or Poltavets'-Ostrianytsia. Further development of the Aufbau plans was delayed by Hitler's failure to seize power in Germany in the Munich Beer Hall Putsch in November 1923, but in 1933 Poltavets'-Ostrianytsia moved to Berlin at Hitler's invitation and his collaboration with Hitler and Alfred Rosenberg intensified again. He supported Rosenberg's plans for a semi-colonial Ukrainian satellite state and pledged the German-trained Ukrainian Cossack forces fully to the Nazi project. Rosenberg himself was in charge of aiding the Ukrainian independence movement in Soviet Ukraine in its propaganda and terrorist activities.

The German support for the right-wing Ukrainian aspirations for national independence stood in direct opposition to the Polish Promethean plans, as it entailed the creation of a German–Ukrainian border through the destruction of the Polish state. In Poltavets'-Ostrianytsia's words, the cause of Ukrainian freedom was bound to eastward German expansion and directed "against [Soviet] Russia, against Poland, and against France". His activities were monitored closely by French and Polish military intelligence.

Charaszkiewicz argues that Germany's approach departed from the basic ideological tenets of Prometheism as it constituted "an elastic, opportunistic platform for diversion, amenable to exploitation for current German political purposes in any direction". He emphasizes that in this field there were never any organizational or ideological ties between Poland and Germany. The legitimate national representatives of the Promethean émigrés allied with Poland showed a marked political loyalty to Poland.

== Principles ==
Throughout the years 1918–1939, according to Charaszkiewicz, the Polish Promethean leadership consistently observed several principles. The purpose of the Promethean enterprise was to liberate from imperialist Russia, of whatever political stripe, the peoples of the Baltic, Black and Caspian Sea basins and to create a series of independent states as a common defensive front against Russian aggression. Each Promethean party respected the political sovereignty of the others. Any disputes between Promethean parties were placed in abeyance pending the liberation of the several parties from Russia. By mutual consent of the Polish and Ukrainian Prometheans (if occasionally less than whole-heartedly on the Petlurists' part), largely Ukrainian-populated areas of southeastern Poland were treated as an internal Polish sphere of interests and were off-bounds to Ukrainian Promethean organizing.

The Polish Promethean leadership, writes Charaszkiewicz, regarded the other Promethean nationalities as equal partners in the common struggle against Russian imperialism. Contrary to what has sometimes been thought, according to Charaszkiewicz the Polish General Staff did not treat the various Promethean émigré communities merely as political instruments to be exploited for ad hoc purposes of diversion.

Prometheism had no organizational or political backing in any Polish political party of the left, right or center. Within the Piłsudskiite camp [obóz Piłsudczyków] itself, Prometheism found many opponents. Paradoxically, among young people in Poland's National Democratic Party—arch-rivals of the Piłsudskiites [Piłsudczycy]—and some other opposition youth organizations, the Promethean question was spontaneously taken up and gained advocates.

The history of Poland's interwar collaboration with the "Promethean peoples" falls into five periods.

== First period (1918–1921) ==
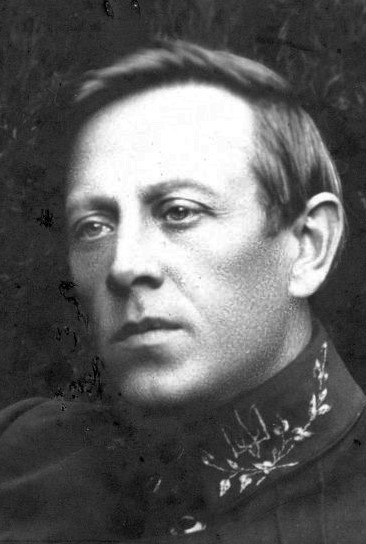
Symon Petliura

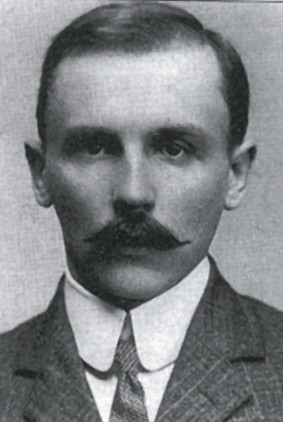
Tytus Filipowicz

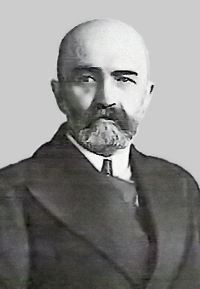
Walery Sławek

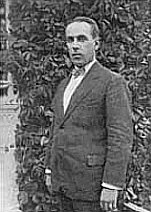
Henryk Józewski

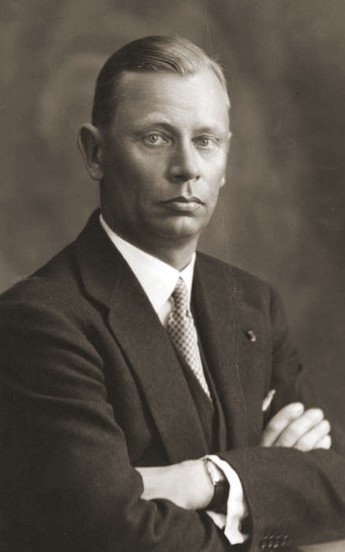
Juliusz Łukasiewicz

In the first period (1918–1921), Poland established her new eastern boundaries in wars with Soviet Russia and Ukraine; her borders with Germany, in the Poznań and Silesian uprisings, and in plebiscite operations in Warmia and Mazury; and her southern borders in plebiscite operations and a brief war with Czechoslovakia over disputed areas of Cieszyn Silesia, Spisz and Orawa.

In the Baltic basin, Finland, Estonia, Lithuania and Latvia emerged as independent states. Poland was among the first countries to extend them recognition, although Polish-Lithuanian relations were strained following the Polish-Lithuanian War.

In the Black and Caspian Sea basins, this period saw the emancipation of Ukraine, Crimea, Georgia, Azerbaijan, Don, Kuban and Northern Caucasus. Signs of national renaissance also appeared in Idel-Ural and Turkestan; there, however, it was limited to the calling of "National Assemblies".

Poland's role in the Promethean process was marked by the conclusion of a Polish–Ukrainian political and military alliance (the Warsaw Agreement, April 1920) with Symon Petlura's Ukrainian People's Republic, Piłsudski's expedition to Kiev (begun April 25, 1920), the designation (February 1919) of Bohdan Kutylowski as Polish minister to the Ukrainian People's Republic, the accreditation of a Polish minister to Caucasus, the naming of a military mission to Caucasus, and the Crimean Republic's motion at the League of Nations (May 17, 1920) that Crimea be made a protectorate of Poland.

Marshal Piłsudski's immediate collaborators in this period included Witold Jodko, Tytus Filipowicz, Gen. Julian Stachiewicz, Col. Walery Sławek, Col. Tadeusz Schaetzel, a Maj. Czarnecki, August Zaleski, Leon Wasilewski, Henryk Józewski, Juliusz Łukasiewicz, Tadeusz Hołówko, Marian Szumlakowski, Jan Dąbski, Mirosław Arciszewski, Maj. Wacław Jędrzejewicz and Roman Knoll.

== Second period (1921–1923) ==
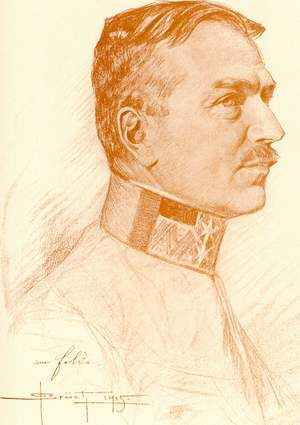
Stanisław Haller

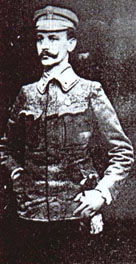
Władysław Sikorski

During Poland's second Promethean period (1921–1923), after the signing of the Treaty of Riga (18 March 1921) ended the Polish-Soviet War of c. 1919 to 1921, Poland proceeded independently within established eastern borders alongside the Baltic states. The states of the Black and Caspian Sea basins, however, lost their independence, being absorbed by the Soviets. What Charaszkiewicz terms the "legitimate" governments and political representatives of these Promethean countries emigrated:

1. the government of the Ukrainian People's Republic, to Poland, France and Czechoslovakia;
2. the government of Georgia, to France;
3. the government of Azerbaijan, to Turkey and France;
4. the governments of Kuban and Don, to Czechoslovakia;
5. the Northern Caucasus' Mountain National Center, to Turkey;
6. the Armenian National Center, to France;
7. the Tatar National Centers (Crimea, Idel-Ural, Turkestan), to Turkey, France and Poland.

During this period, Marshal Piłsudski still remained in power, first as Chief of State (Polish: Naczelnik Państwa), later transitionally as chief of the General Staff (Polish: Sztab Główny). Promethean affairs now also involved the successive chiefs of the General Staff, Gen. Władysław Sikorski and Gen. Stanisław Haller, and the chief of the General Staff's Section II (Oddział II: intelligence), Col. Ignacy Matuszewski.

On January 10, 1921, shortly after the end of the Polish-Soviet War, the economist and statistician Włodzimierz Wakar founded the Union for the Rapprochement of Reborn Nations. It had sections for specific nationalities, including Belarusians, Finns, Poles, Ukrainians, Crimean Tatars, Kuban Cossacks, Georgians, Azerbaijanis, and Ciscaucasians. However, the organization did not receive support from the Polish government; accordingly it failed to achieve its goals and ceased its activities in 1923.

Poland worked together with Promethean political émigrés who were in official contact with Poland's Foreign Ministry, with Polish diplomatic offices in Istanbul, Bucharest, Prague, Tehran and Paris, and with the Polish General Staff. As early as 1922, the first group of Georgian officers, recommended by the Georgian government, were accepted into the Polish Army.

== Third period (1923–1926) ==
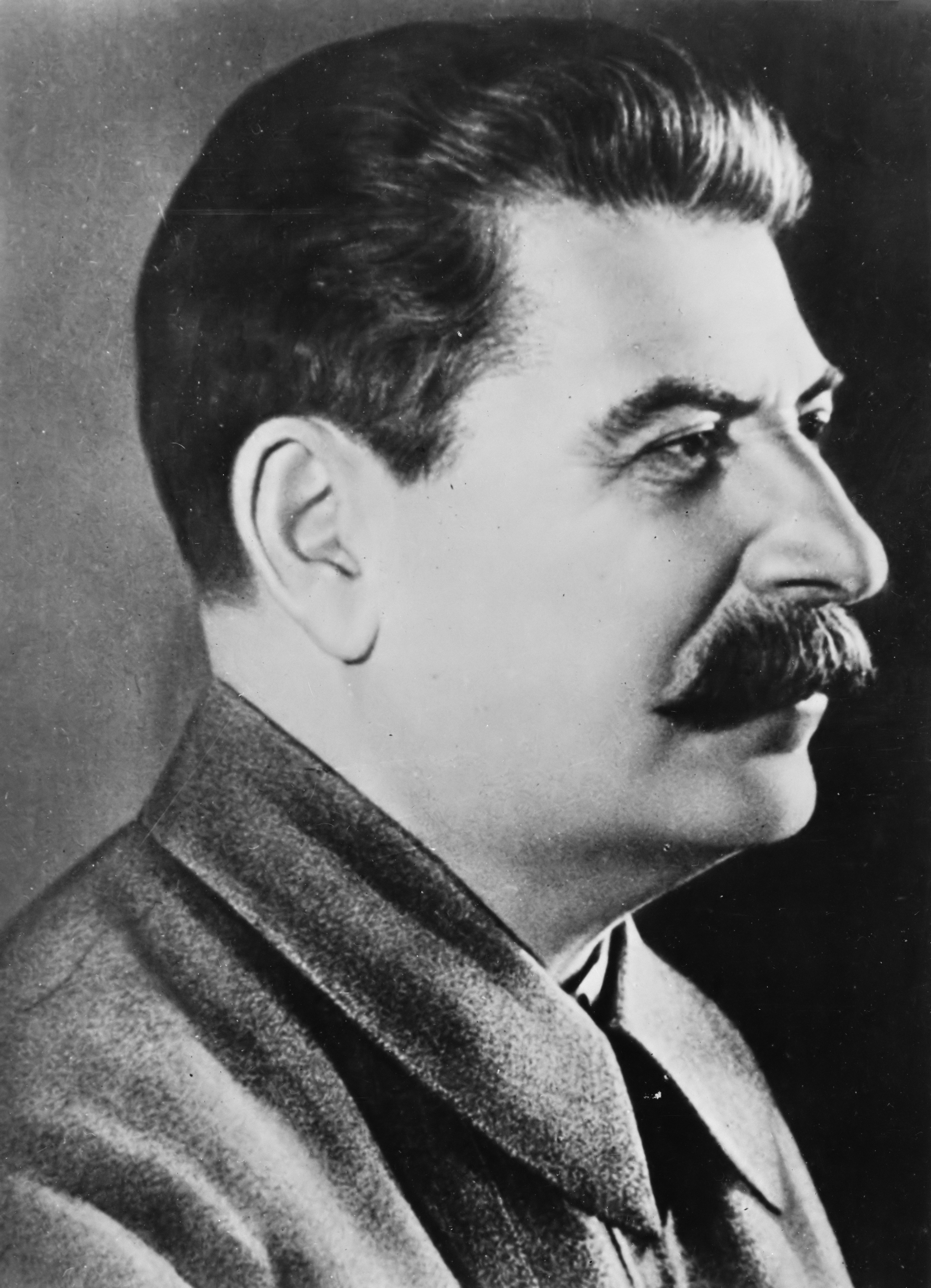
Joseph Stalin

In the third period (1923–1926), after Piłsudski had removed himself from power, successive Polish governments eliminated the Promethean question from their agendas. The Soviets realized Joseph Stalin's nationalities program in the Soviet Union's non-Russian areas by inaugurating the Autonomous Republics, while suppressing the last impulses toward independence on the part of those Republics' populations.

Polish contacts with the Promethean émigrés were continued, without the knowledge or consent of the Polish government: in military matters, by Col. Schaetzel, Maj. Czarnecki and Captain Henryk Suchanek-Suchecki, chief of the Nationalities Department (Wydział) in the Ministry of Internal Affairs; and at the Foreign Ministry, by the chief of the Eastern Department, Juliusz Łukasiewicz. An exception to the Polish government's official attitude pertained to Georgian Prometheism, which enjoyed support with both the foreign minister, Aleksander Skrzyński, and the chief of the General Staff, Gen. Stanisław Haller.

== Fourth period (1926–1932) ==
The fourth period (1926–1932), from Piłsudski's return to power in the May 1926 Coup to the conclusion of the 1932 Polish-Soviet Nonaggression Pact, was the period of the most determined, organized and active collaboration with Promethean organizations.

In 1926, the "Prometheus" organization was founded in Paris, which eventually included representatives of Azerbaijan, Crimea, Don, Georgia, Idel-Ural, Ingria, Karelia, Komi, Kuban, Northern Caucasus, Turkestan, and Ukraine.

In addition to "Prometheus," the Committee for Friendship of the Peoples of the Caucasus, Turkestan, and Ukraine operated there, as well as the "France-Orient" association, founded by Jan Tokarzewski-Karaszewicz.

In 1927 the Promethean problem was given official organizational form at the Polish Foreign Ministry and General Staff. In the previous periods, Prometheism had been treated at various high echelons but had possessed no single official home. Now a close coordination was established between Poland's Foreign Ministry and General Staff, as politically representing the Promethean question, and with the ministries of Military Affairs and Internal Affairs, as indirectly involved with it (the Military Ministry, with foreign contract officers; the Internal Ministry, with internal Polish-Ukrainian affairs).

Later in 1928, the "Prometheus" organization relocated to Warsaw and was renamed "Prometheus" – League of Nations Enslaved by Russia.

Important events in this period included:

=== General Promethean affairs ===
1. the creation of an Eastern Institute in Warsaw, with a program in Near and Far Eastern studies, the Institute being treated as a political instrument for general Promethean matters;
2. the establishment, at the Eastern Institute, of an Orientalist Youth Circle, a youth organization dedicated to general Promethean affairs, with offices in Kraków, Vilnius and Harbin;
3. the founding of a quarterly, Wschód (The East), devoted to Promethean affairs;
4. the establishment of academic scholarships for Promethean students at Warsaw, Vilnius, Poznań, Kraków, Paris, Berlin and Cairo;
5. the founding of four Promethean clubs, in Warsaw, Paris, Helsinki and Harbin;
6. the founding, in Paris and Helsinki, of the propaganda monthlies, Promethee and Prometheus;
7. the establishment of collaborative links with France-Orient in Paris.

=== Ukrainian affairs ===
1. the organization of a military staff for the Ukrainian People's Republic, including an organizational-operational section (subordinate to Poland's Gen. Julian Stachiewicz), an intelligence section (subordinate to Poland's Section II), and a propaganda section (subordinate to the Polish General Staff's Office Z);
2. the recruitment of Petlurist Ukrainian officers as contract officers for the Polish Army;
3. the creation of three separate press agencies: in Warsaw ("A.T.E."), Paris ("Ofinor") and Bucharest ("Ukraintag");
4. the founding of a Polish-Ukrainian Bulletin;
5. the creation in Warsaw of a Ukrainian Institute of Learning;
6. the founding of a General Ukrainian Council coordinating Petlurist émigré centers in European countries.

This period saw two fundamental political events in Ukrainian Promethean affairs:

- the May 26, 1926, assassination, in Paris—according to Charaszkiewicz, at Soviet instigation—of Otaman Symon Petlura; and
- the 1930 trial, in Kiev, of Serhiy Yefremov, which demonstrated the existence of a secret national organization in Ukraine that was in contact with the Government of the Ukrainian People's Republic.

=== Caucasus affairs ===
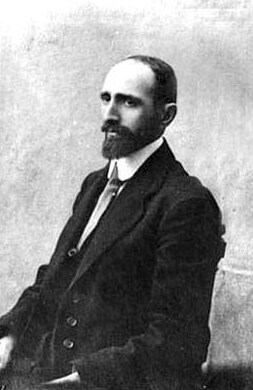
Noe Ramishvili

1. organization, in Turkey and Iran, of offices for contacts with Azerbaijan, Georgia, and the Caucasus Mountains (the Georgian organization carried out about 20 expeditions to their country, and the Caucasian Mountain organization kept up regular contacts with their country on at least a monthly basis);
2. creation of a Caucasus National Committee and the elaboration of a constitution for a Caucasus Confederation;
3. recruitment into the Polish Army, as contract officers, of a further group of Georgian officers, and of Azerbaijanis and Caucasus Mountaineers, upon recommendation by their legitimate national representatives.

This period saw the following notable political events in Caucasus affairs:

- the December 7, 1930, assassination in Paris, by the Soviets, of the Georgian minister Noe Ramishvili; and
- pronouncements by Shalva Eliava, the "Soviet governor of Caucasus", at the 1930 Georgian communist congress in Tiflis, that the national movement in the Caucasus was under the influence of the Caucasus National Committee.

The growing revolutionary ferment in the Caucasus, especially in Azerbaijan, collaboratively engaged all the Caucasus national elements.

=== Idel-Ural and Turkestan affairs ===
1. the development of pro-independence propaganda in Idel-Ural, Crimea and Turkestan, and intense Soviet polemics against the Promethean press;
2. the establishment of ties with these countries;
3. direct participation in the World Moslem Congress in Jerusalem (1931), whose political aspect, due to the participation of Promethean representatives (Said Shamil, a Caucasus Mountaineer and grandson of Imam Shamil, and Ğayaz İsxaqí, a Kazan Tatar intellectual), turned against the Soviet Union. In this period, the world Moslem press, especially of Egypt and Arabia, conducted an intense anti-Soviet campaign. Said Shamil Bey was chosen as secretary of the Congress' executive center.

Charaszkiewicz notes the occurrence, in Crimean political actions, of "Wallenrodism", revealed at the trial of Veli İbraimov, who was sentenced to death by the Soviets. Likewise the trial of Soltanğäliev (a direct collaborator of Joseph Stalin's during Stalin's tenure as commissar for nationalities affairs) disclosed methods used by the Volga Tatars and the peoples of Turkestan in fighting the Soviet government.

=== Cossack affairs ===
A successful campaign was waged that helped stimulate a separatist movement among many Cossack émigré groups. This injected a substantial political diversion into White Russian émigré ranks.

This Prometheist period also witnessed a development that was independent of the movement, but which would ultimately play a role in regard to it. There was heightened diversionary activity in Poland by the OUN (Organization of Ukrainian Nationalists), supported by both Germany and Czechoslovakia and even by Lithuania. There were many acts of expropriation and sabotage against the Polish community and government by members of OUN combat units in southeastern Poland. This in turn led to "pacification" operations by the Polish authorities against the Polish-Ukrainian community.

The pacifications, Charaszkiewicz emphasizes, were never discussed in advance with Polish Promethean officials. Those at the Foreign Ministry and at the General Staff were not pleased with these operations, which made Promethean activities that much more difficult.

A greater shock to the Prometheists, Polish and Ukrainian, however, was the death of Tadeusz Hołówko, murdered by OUN members on August 29, 1931, at Truskawiec.

Charaszkiewicz is far from blaming all of Poland's difficulties with her minorities, especially the Ukrainians (who in most of southeastern interwar Poland were the majority), on external, especially German, influences. He argues that Poland had "no planned, consistent and constructive internal policy" with regard to her minorities. This lack could not bode well for the Promethean effort, when every fifth Polish citizen (that is, six million people) were Ukrainian.

Moreover, the Soviet Union sought to an equal degree to exploit Poland's internal disarray—indeed, in 1921–1931, to a greater degree than the Germans. Soviet communist propaganda in Poland's Eastern Borderlands (Kresy Wschodnie), combined with a pro-Ukrainian Soviet attitude toward Soviet Ukraine, created strong pro-Soviet sentiment among Polish Ukrainians. This sentiment would persist until the subsequent mass Soviet resettlements, arrests, executions and famines of 1933–1938.

The period 1926–1932 was marked by the participation of a large number of Poles in the Promethean endeavor:

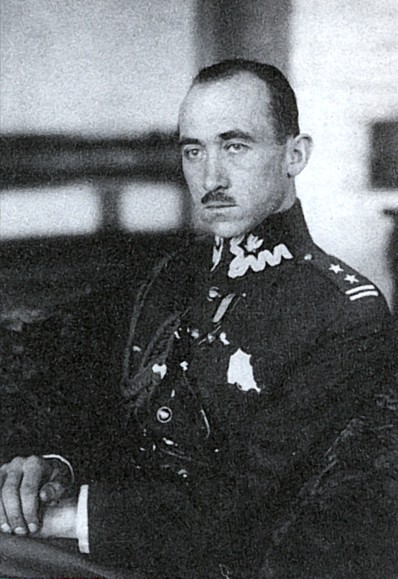
Tadeusz Schaetzel

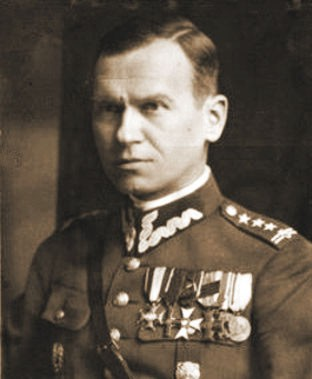
Tadeusz Pełczyński

1. at the Foreign Ministry: Tadeusz Hołówko, Tadeusz Schaetzel, Stanisław Hempel, Adam Tarnowski, Mirosław Arciszewski, Roman Knoll, Juliusz Łukasiewicz, Marian Szumlakowski, Stanisław Zaċwilichowski, Jan Gawroński, Zygmunt Mostowski, Władysław Zaleski, Kazimierz Marian Wyszyński, Karol Dubicz-Penther, Władysław Pelc, Ksawery Zalewski, Władysław Wolski, Piotr Kurnicki, Wacław Knoll;
2. at the General Staff: Brig. Gen. Julian Stachiewicz, Col. Tadeusz Schaetzel, Col. Tadeusz Pełczyński, Col. Józef Englicht, Maj. Edmund Charaszkiewicz, Maj. Włodzimierz Dąbrowski, Maj. Stanisław Gliński, Maj. Jerzy Krzymowski, Maj. Karol Krzewski-Lilienfeld, Capt. Stefan Nowaczek, Capt. Jan Rybczyński, Lt. Jan Helcman, Józef Skarżyński, Aleksander Eugeniusz Piwnicki, Stefan Sipa, Lt. Antoni Zaręba;
3. at the Ministry of Internal Affairs: Henryk Suchanek-Suchecki, Stanisław Łaniecki, Emil Miśkiewicz;
4. at the Ministry of Education: Aleksander Kawałkowski, Franciszek Salezy Potocki, Zdzisław Meyer, Juliusz Znaniecki, Adam Miłobędzki;
5. in the socio-political sphere: Senator Stanisław Siedlecki (president of the Eastern Institute), Wacław Sieroszewski, Stanisław Trzeciak, Antoni Wincenty Kwiatkowski, Antoni Około-Kułak, Prof. Olgierd Górka (general secretary and director of the Eastern Institute), Stanisław Korwin-Pawłowski (general secretary of the Eastern Institute), Bolesław Bielawski, Stanisław Józef Paprocki (director of the Institute for Study of National Minority Affairs), Leon Wasilewski, Włodzimierz Bączkowski, Feliks Ibiański-Zahora, Wacław Wincenty Łypacewicz, Władysław Wielhorski (director of the Institute for Study of Eastern Europe, in Vilnius), Marian Świechowski, Prof. Jan Kucharzewski, Prof. Marceli Handelsman, Prof. Stanisław Poniatowski, Prof. Ludwik Kolankowski, Prof. Oskar Halecki, Prof. Stanisław Franciszek Zajączkowski, Prof. Józef Ujejski, Prof. Stanisław Szober, Andrzej Strug, Marian Malinowski, Alfred Szczęsny Wielopolski, Wojciech Stpiczyński, Józef Łobodowski, Prof. Marian Zdziechowski, Władysław Woydyno.

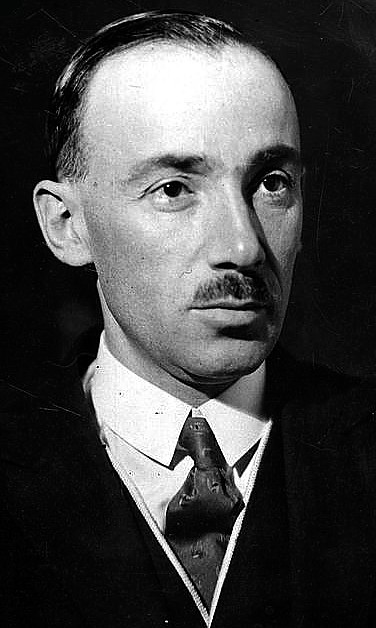
Wacław Jędrzejewicz

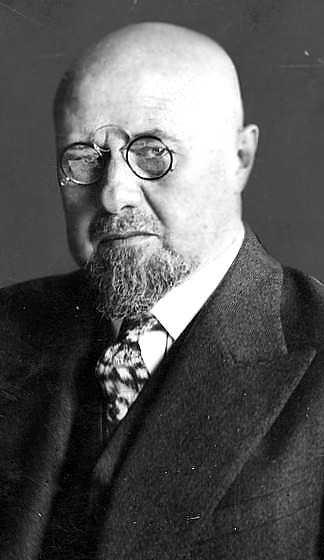
Aleksander Prystor

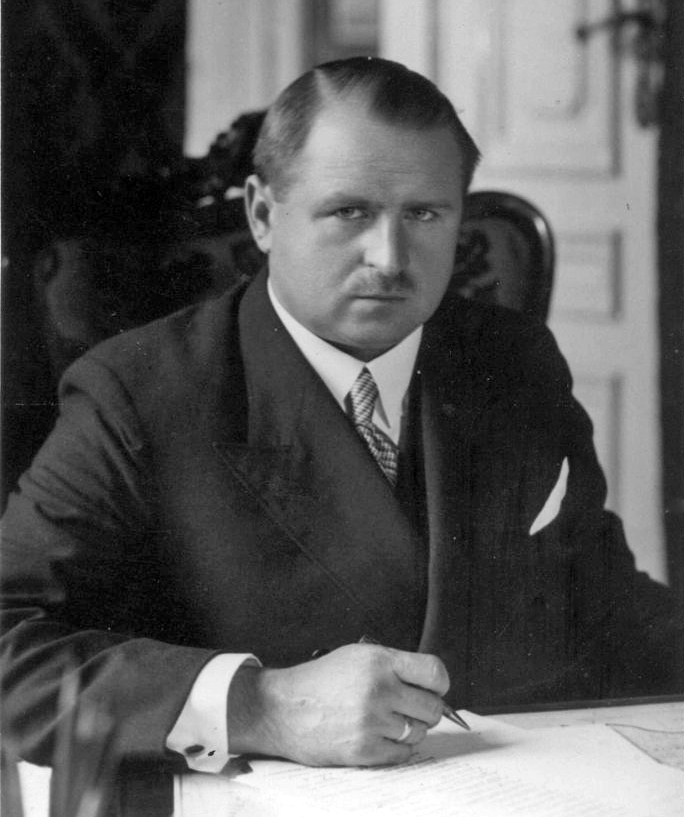
Stefan Starzyński

Additionally, thanks to Tadeusz Hołówko's exceptional leadership in Promethean matters, a number of Polish government ministers participated indirectly or directly: Walery Sławek, Aleksander Prystor, August Zaleski, Janusz Jędrzejewicz, Wacław Jędrzejewicz, Bronisław Pieracki, Adam Koc, Stefan Starzyński, Marian Zyndram-Kościałkowski.

A separate category of Promethean ideological endeavor comprised the work of Adam Skwarczyński.

In this period (1926–1932), favorable political circumstances within and without Poland, adequate financing and, above all, full mutual confidence among all the participants, led to an exceptional level of Promethean activity—in the conduct of propaganda within the Promethean countries, in the political efforts of the Promethean émigrés, and in propaganda outside Poland.

Regular conferences were held, usually involving Tadeusz Hołówko, Brig. Gen. Julian Stachiewicz, Col. Tadeusz Schaetzel, Henryk Suchanek-Suchecki, Maj. Edmund Charaszkiewicz, and an official from the Foreign Ministry. Charaszkiewicz would present an extensive report on work accomplished, and this would be followed by discussion of various Promethean topics.

The Promethean project was entrusted to Office 2 only in late 1927 or perhaps in 1928. Before that, it had never been a domain of the Polish General Staff's diversion unit (Office A.1, later Office U); thus Charaszkiewicz's predecessor, Col. Puszczyński, had not been encumbered with this responsibility. Puszczyński, Charaszkiewicz explains, had not initially attached importance to Prometheism, due to an overoptimistic assessment of the new Soviet Union; but in time he came to support the Promethean concept.

== Fifth period (1933–1939) ==
The last, fifth period of prewar Polish Prometheism (1933–1939) was, in Charaszkiewicz's words, one of "seven lean years". A number of developments contributed to this:

1. The Polish-Soviet non-aggression pact (1932) stopped Polish policy-makers from continuing Promethean work in the field. It was felt that in the Soviet Union a process of national renewal was to some extent taking place spontaneously in the Promethean countries, thanks to the existence of autonomous republics, to Soviet support of general education in the national languages, and to natural reactions of protest among local peoples to economic, religious and cultural phenomena; and so activity on the ground could be dispensed with for the moment. The solidarity and strength of the political émigré communities should, however, continue to be maintained. The conclusion of the Polish-Soviet pact led to the Polish Foreign Ministry and all Polish governmental authorities distancing themselves from external Promethean undertakings. This substantially reduced the effectiveness of those endeavors and created a view in international Promethean circles that Poland was slowly moving away from Prometheism. Henceforth the whole Promethean question, including the administration of funds, became concentrated within Office 2 at the General Staff's Section II (intelligence).
2. The deaths of Ramishvili and Zaćwilichowski (1930) and of Hołówko (1931), the most active promoters of Prometheism, were an irreparable loss to the movement.
3. The worldwide economic crisis, and resultant austere government budgets, suddenly reduced available funds by nearly 50%, bringing all Polish efforts down to merest maintenance levels.
4. The death on May 12, 1935, of Marshal Piłsudski, founder of Prometheism, was yet another powerful blow. In Charaszkiewicz's view, it left Prometheism—"a political idea of rare visionary power... that required prophetic [powers of] political prediction"—lacking a patron of comparable authority. Piłsudski's death was experienced as a personal loss by the Promethean peoples. Henceforth the movement's efforts continued more by virtue of inertia than by encouragement from new Polish decision-makers.
5. Adolf Hitler's rise to power in Germany, the creation of an anticommunist bloc in the Berlin-Rome-Tokyo axis, and its eagerness to collaborate with national Promethean movements, created a difficult, complicated situation for the Promethean organizations that remained in Poland's political orbit. While the Promethean political forces aligned with Poland were of higher quality and potential, the Germans' relentless propaganda created a dangerous rival to Polish Promethean efforts. The latter in this period, according to Charaszkiewicz, "were utterly devoid of activity, character and plan".
6. The rise of danger on Poland's west fostered a view in many Polish minds that the country's eastern border should be quieted.

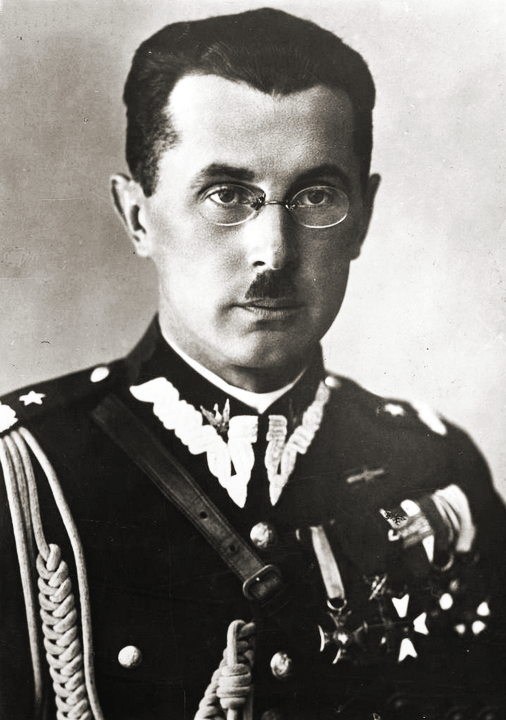
Wacław Stachiewicz

Until Piłsudski's death in 1935, little changed in respect to personnel on the Polish Promethean side, apart from the official distancing of government leaders, especially in the Foreign Ministry, due to the concluded Polish-Soviet pact. With the shift in government leadership beginning in June 1935, there ensued a clear decline in Polish Promethean leadership. The "group of colonels" lost their influence; Col. Tadeusz Pełczyński took a much less active role; and his successor, Col. Marian Józef Smoleński (generally known as "Józef Smoleński"), and Charaszkiewicz's immediate superior, Col. Jan Kazimierz Ciastoń, did not embrace Prometheism. Tadeusz Kobylański, Col. Schaetzel's successor as chief of the Foreign Ministry's Eastern Department, though inclined to support Prometheism, lacked a deep enough political foundation and faced substantial financial impediments. The attitudes of Marshal Edward Rydz-Śmigły and the chief of the General Staff, Brigadier General Wacław Teofil Stachiewicz, remained to the last uncertain.

== World War II and since ==
The Promethean agenda continued, during World War II, to interest other countries, including Germany (especially in regard to Ukraine), Finland (struggling with the Soviet Union), France and the Soviet Union's neighbor, Turkey.

Edmund Charaszkiewicz concluded his February 12, 1940, Paris paper with the observation that "Poland's turning away from these [Promethean] processes can in no way halt [them], while leaving us sidelined and exposing us to enormous losses that flow from the age-old principle that 'those who are absent, lose'. [Poland]'s central position in the Promethean chain dictates to us readiness and presence at any disintegrative processes in Russia, and a leading Polish participation at their accomplishment."

After World War II, the Government of Poland was effectively a puppet state of the Soviet Union and was in no position to resume an acknowledged Promethean program. Despite this, the Polish people, through Solidarity, played a major role in the Revolutions of 1989. The 1991 disintegration of the Soviet Union largely vindicated the predictions of those Poles and others who had anticipated the event and, in some cases, had worked for it.

On November 22, 2007, at Tbilisi, Georgia, a statue of Prometheus was dedicated by Georgian President Mikheil Saakashvili and Polish President Lech Kaczyński. Erected in the land where, according to Greek myth, the Titan had been imprisoned and tortured by Zeus after stealing fire from Olympus and giving it to man, the statue celebrates the efforts of Poles and Georgians to achieve the independence of Georgia and of other peoples from the Russian Empire and its successor state, the Soviet Union.

Prometheism has regained relevance in political discourse following the 2022 Russian invasion of Ukraine. The Free Nations of Post-Russia Forum brings together a number of movements aiming for the independence of national minorities within the Russian Federation.

== See also ==
- Alliance of the periphery—similar political tactics used by Israel
- Demographics of the Soviet Union
- Edmund Charaszkiewicz
- Giedroyc Doctrine
- Historical demographics of Poland
- History of Polish intelligence services
- Intermarium (Międzymorze)
- Kultura
- Lenin's national policy
- Polish–Georgian alliance
- Polish–Romanian alliance
- Predictions of the collapse of the Soviet Union
- Pro-independence movements in the Russian Civil War
- Treaty of Warsaw (1920) (also known as the Polish-Ukrainian alliance)
- URSAL
- Volhynia Experiment
