= Stachiewicz =

Stachiewicz is a Polish surname, probably related to the Polish name of Stach or Stanislaus. Notable people with the surname include:

- Wacław Stachiewicz (1894–1973), Polish writer, geologist and military commander and general of the Polish Army
- Julian Stachiewicz (1890–1934), Polish historian, writer and officer of the Polish Army
- Piotr Stachiewicz (1858–1938), Polish painter and illustrator
