= Said Shamil =

North Caucasian politician and émigré leader (1901–1981)

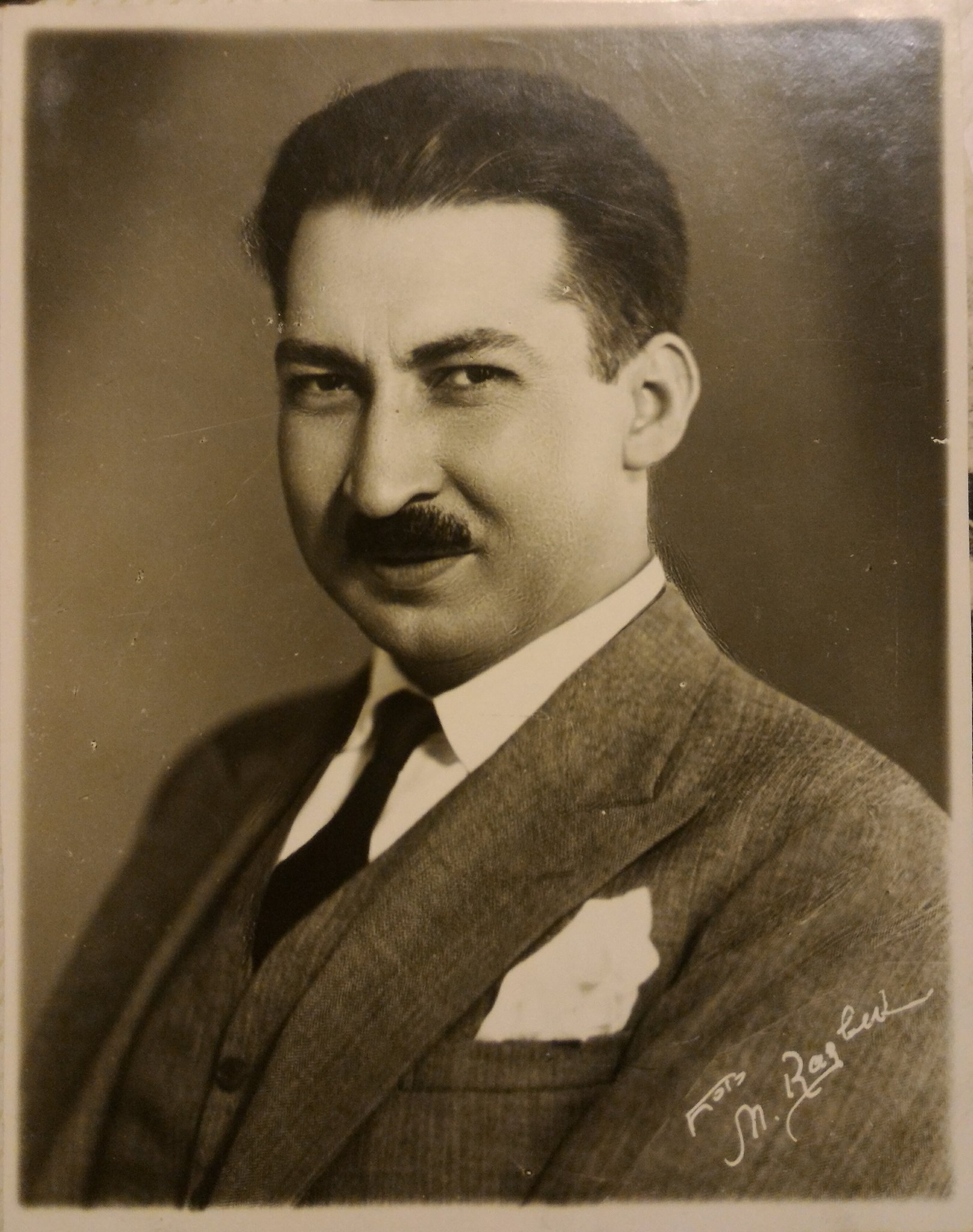
- Shamil in the 1930s

Monarch of the North Caucasian Emirate
- Reign: 29 October 1920 – 15 March 1921
- Predecessor: Monarchy established
- Successor: Monarchy abolished
- Born: 1901; Constantinople, Ottoman Empire (now Istanbul, Turkey)
- Died: 21 March 1981 (aged 79–80); Haydarpaşa, Istanbul, Turkey
Names
- Muhammad Said Shamil; МухІамад-СагІид Шамил
- Military career
- Relatives: Imam Shamil (grandfather)
- Allegiance: Ottoman Empire
- Conflicts: World War I; Russian Civil War; Dagestan uprising
- Other work: Prometheism

Muhammad Said Shamil, (Note: Avar: МухІамад-СагІид Шамил, romanized: Muḥʳamad Sa'id Šamil; Polish: Muhammad Said Szamil; Turkish: Mehmed Said Şamil) also referred to in the North Caucasus as Muhammad Said Bey, (Note: In this Ottoman Turkish style name, the given name is Muhammad Said, the title is Bey, and there is no family name.) or Said-Bek Shamil (1901 – 21 March 1981) was a North Caucasian politician and émigré leader. The grandson of rebel leader Imam Shamil, Shamil was the monarch of the North Caucasian Emirate during the 1920–1921 Dagestan uprising before later going into exile. He was one of the leading figures of Prometheism, a Polish-led political project seeking to bring about the disintegration of the Soviet Union, and participated in several political projects by North Caucasian émigrés such as the Committee for the Independence of the Caucasus and the People's Party of Caucasian Highlanders (which he led). Shamil played a significant role in encouraging anti-communism in the Arab and Islamic world during the interwar period.

== Family and early life ==
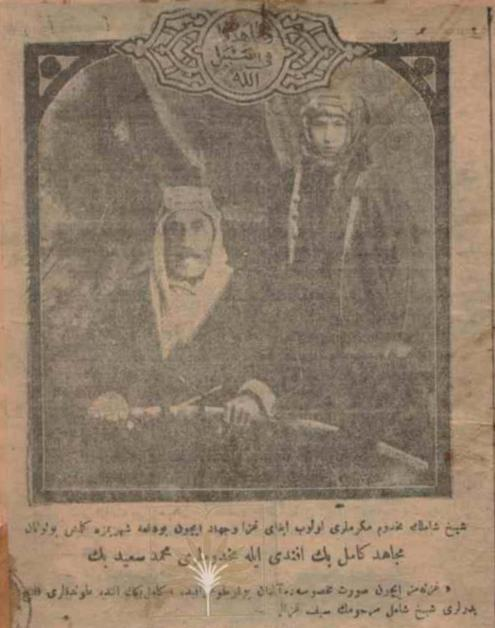
Said (right) pictured with his father, Muhammad Kamil, in Ottoman propaganda

Muhammad Said Shamil was born in 1901 to Muhammad Kamil and Naciba Khanum. Muhammad Kamil (1863–1951), born in Kaluga, was a general of the Ottoman Army and additionally the youngest son of Imam Shamil, one of the leaders of North Caucasian resistance to Russia amidst the Caucasian War. Naciba Khanum was the daughter of a teacher from Medina, named Muhammad Said Efendi. Said had two sisters, Nacia (1899–1983) and Nacabat (1916–1983).

Shamil was born in Constantinople (now Istanbul), the capital of the Ottoman Empire. He spent his earliest years in the Arab-majority lands of the Ottoman Empire before returning to the city to begin his education. According to his own recollections he studied at the elite Galatasaray High School. At this time he also became acquainted with other North Caucasian emigrants.

Shamil fought in the Ottoman Army during World War I. In 1916 he participated in a Lausanne meeting billed as the "Congress of the 26 Oppressed Peoples of Russia", organised by the Union des Nationalités of Juozas Gabrys.

In addition to his native Avar language, Shamil spoke Arabic, English, French, Russian, and Turkish. He married the daughter of Mehmet Fazıl Paşa, another Dagestani émigré, but the two maintained a strictly formal relationship and never bore any children.

== Dagestan uprising ==
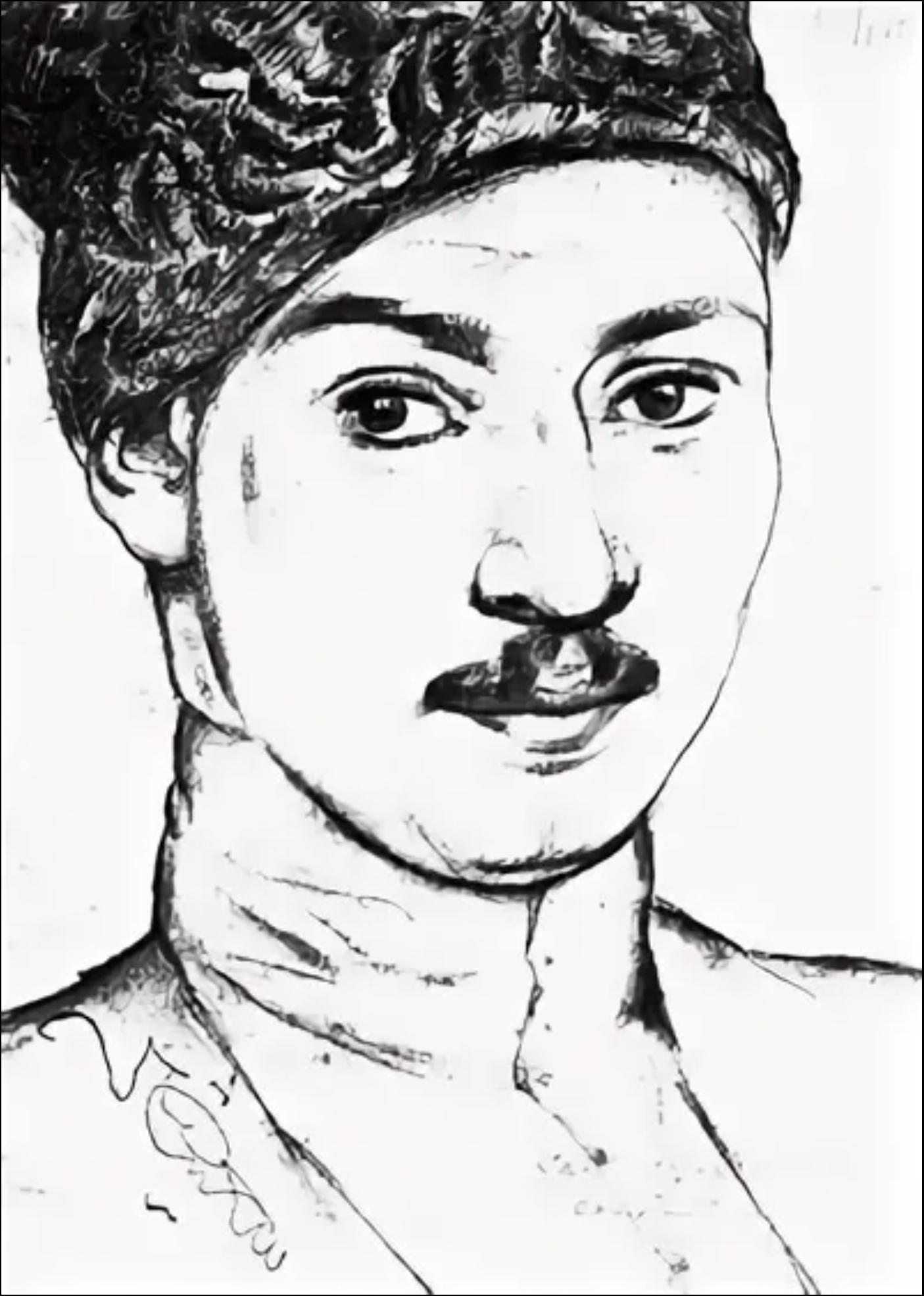
Portrait of Shamil by Xalilbeg Musajasul, 1920

Amidst the Russian Revolution the Mountainous Republic of the Northern Caucasus was established as an independent state on 11 May 1918. Later replaced by the North Caucasian Emirate, the region was invaded by the White Army in 1919 and subsequently by the Russian Soviet Federative Socialist Republic in 1920, bringing an end to the region's independence. On 11 May 1920 a group of anti-communist North Caucasian political figures gathered in the village of Vedeno, where they selected Muhammad Kamil as leader of their uprising. As Muhammad Kamil was ill, he sent Said, then aged 19, to serve as leader on his behalf. Cem Kumuk, a Turkish historian, disputes the notion of Muhammad Kamil's illness, noting that he lived another 31 years, and suggests that his refusal may have been for other reasons.

Shamil arrived in Dagestan on 29 October 1920, having left under the protection of French forces. His arrival boosted the morale of the rebels, and he brought with him money and textiles intended to aid the uprising. According to contemporary accounts he expressed protest when asked to lead the rebellion, stating that he was too young to undertake such an activity. Despite his demurral, however, his appointment as leader continued, and he was formally inaugurated as a monarch during a meeting with imam Najmuddin of Gotzo in the village of Gidatli. Shamil was given a bodyguard detachment consisting of 25 men from the village of Gimry, his own family's home village.

Kumuk states that Shamil's role in the uprising was likely intended to be to incur support from the Allied Powers and the Ottoman Empire's community of North Caucasians. He also provided significant moral support to the rebels as the grandson of Imam Shamil, and, despite his official status as the uprising's monarch, held little actual power.

The rebellion had varying degrees of success. The pro-Shamil troops, comprising about 500 men, were hampered by poor discipline and ultimately failed to defeat the Red Army. Shamil himself was wounded during the uprising, and he remained in hiding until March 1921, upon which he returned to Turkey and was admitted to a military hospital. He stayed hospitalised for the next two months.

Soviet leaders Sergo Ordzhonikidze and Nazhmudin Samursky met with Ottoman general Kâzım Karabekir in the Armenian city of Gyumri in mid-May 1921 and demanded that Karabekir hand over Shamil to them. Karabekir claimed that Shamil was an agent of the Allies and that he would be handed over to the Bolsheviks as soon as he was captured; in fact, it is unclear if he was ever subject to prosecution in Turkey for his role in the uprising, though it is likely that any litigation which may have existed was covered up by his cousin, sports executive Mehmet Şamil Bey.

== In emigration ==
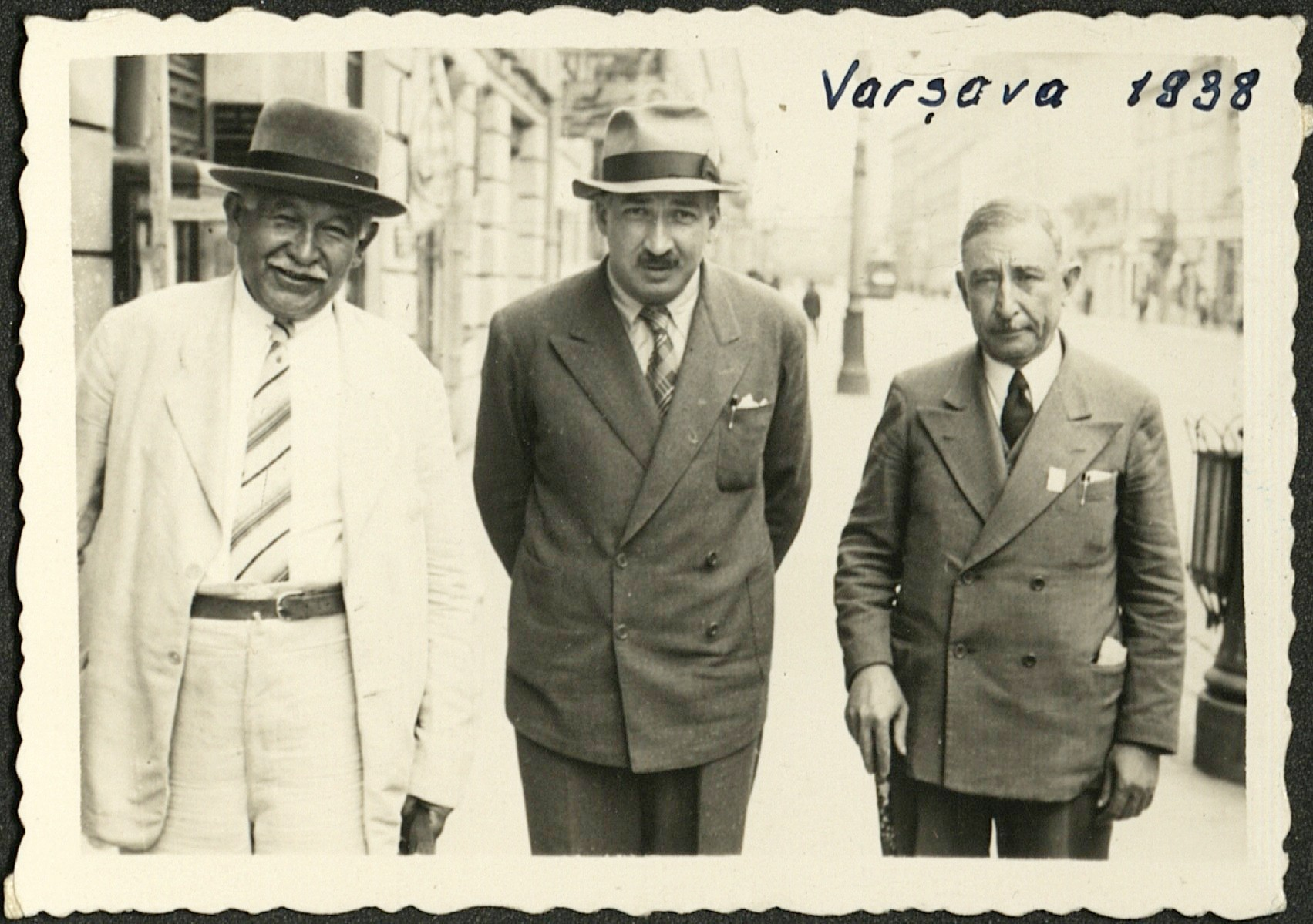
Ayaz İshaki, Said Shamil, and Osman Kocaoğlu (from left to right) in Warsaw, 1938

After first travelling to Ankara, Shamil quickly travelled to Samsun, where he met with several large groups of North Caucasian emigrants and called on them to unite in an effort to overthrow the Soviet government in the Caucasus. According to Soviet intelligence, he visited Karabekir in Kars for six days in August 1921. During this time he shared with Karabekir his plans for an uprising, though Karabekir rejected them as being untimely.

Karabekir sent Shamil to the city of Erzurum in a bid to prevent a worsening of relations between the Turkish National Movement and the Soviets. After spending two months in Erzurum doing nothing, Shamil began to write to Karabekir threatening to support the Allies if he was not allowed to launch his uprising. Rather than caving to his threats, Karabekir introduced him to Bekir Sami Kunduh, then based in Paris, so that he could get acquainted with both Caucasian emigrant circles and the French political scene.

Shamil received financial support from the French government until October 1922. This support ended after Shamil failed to demonstrate concrete plans to achieve his planned uprising, limiting himself to writing letters under the title of "Leader of the Defence and National Unity of the North Caucasus". Soon, however, he found new partners in the government of the Second Polish Republic, and he met with Polish ambassador to Turkey Roman Knoll in late 1924. Knoll assisted Shamil in organising a group known as the "Union for the Liberation of the Caucasus", which the latter led. He was also an important figure in Prometheism. Much of the information Shamil provided to the Polish government at this time was outdated and ordinary, but he relayed it to colonel Tadeusz Schaetzel, Poland's military attaché, as if it was of critical importance. In a particularly notable instance, a 21 April 1927 letter by Shamil to Schaetzel informed him of the creation of the Circassian Cavalry Detachment in French Syria. Contrary to Shamil's claims, the detachment had been established in 1922 and was unrelated to him.

Shamil continued to draw the attention of the Soviet government in exile. During the trial of Najmuddin, who had previously declared Shamil leader of the Dagestan uprising, the NKVD accused him of receiving a letter from Shamil to the leaders of Chechen auls promising weapons if an uprising was launched. As the letter does not exist in Soviet archives, the allegation of the letter was likely created by the NKVD.

Shamil founded the People's Party of Caucasian Highlanders on 18 November 1925 in Prague. He served as the party's general secretary. Another group, Akhmed Tsalikov's Union of Highlanders of the Caucasus, merged into the party. A second group including Shamil, the Committee for the Independence of the Caucasus, was established on 15 July 1926. These organisations were both dominated by Shamil's efforts to establish himself as the undisputed leader of the North Caucasian émigrés in Poland, and he accused other émigrés (including Tsalikov) of being Soviet agents.

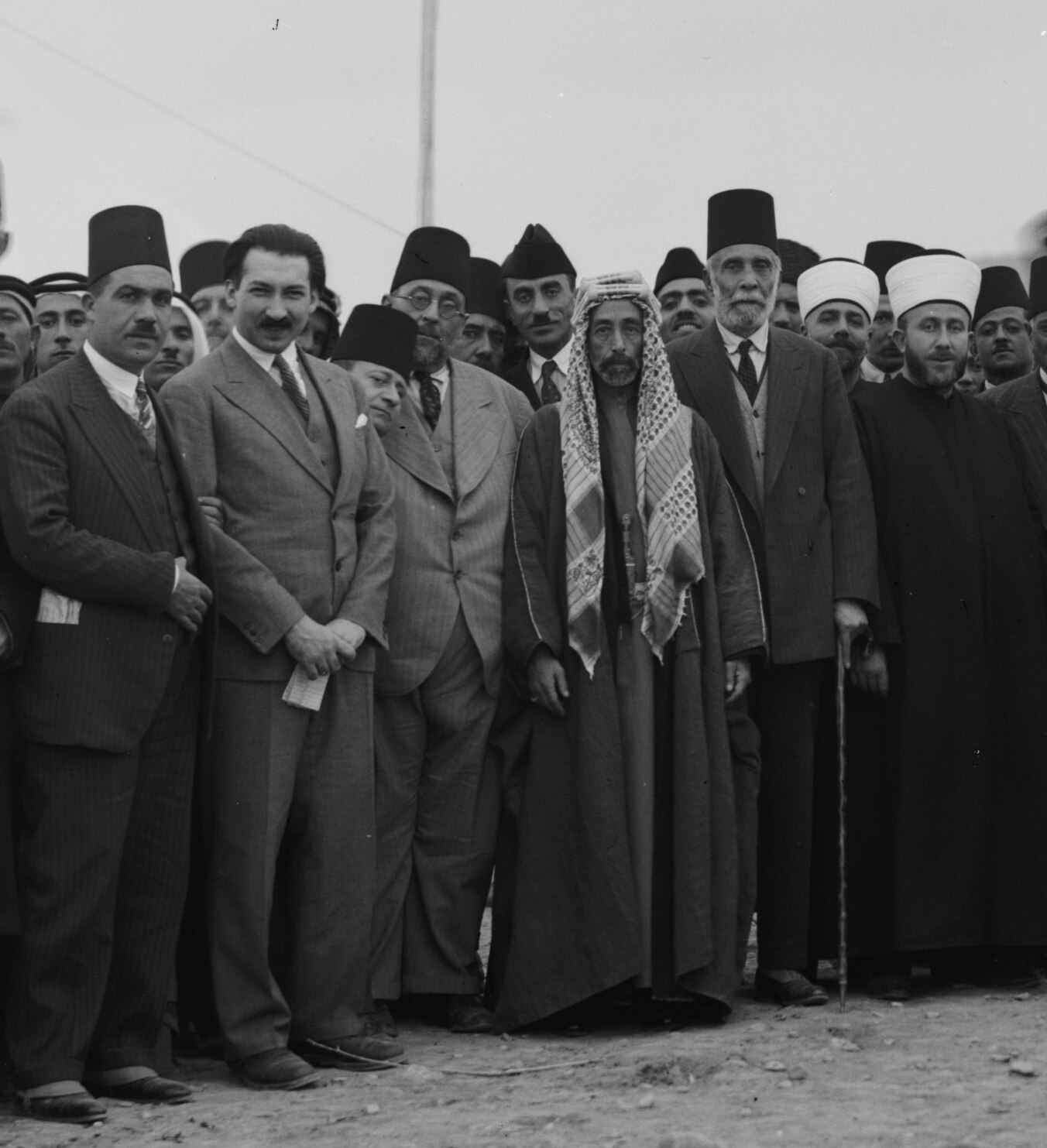
Said Shamil (2nd from left) among the group of World Islamic Congress at Shunet Nimrin, Transjordan

Shamil continued to write several articles in journals during this period. During the first meeting of Amin al-Husseini's World Islamic Congress in December 1931 Shamil was selected as a member of the congress, and was the youngest member. In this capacity he worked to further anti-communism in the Islamic world, and played a significant role in encouraging the governments of Muslim states to take decisions that opposed the Soviet Union. He also had a diplomatic passport from Saudi Arabia, and was a member of Rabita World Islamic Organisation, tasked with helping oppressed Muslims.

Shamil served as a representative in the Council of Confederation of the Caucasus, founded in 1935. On the eve of World War II he was living in Warsaw.

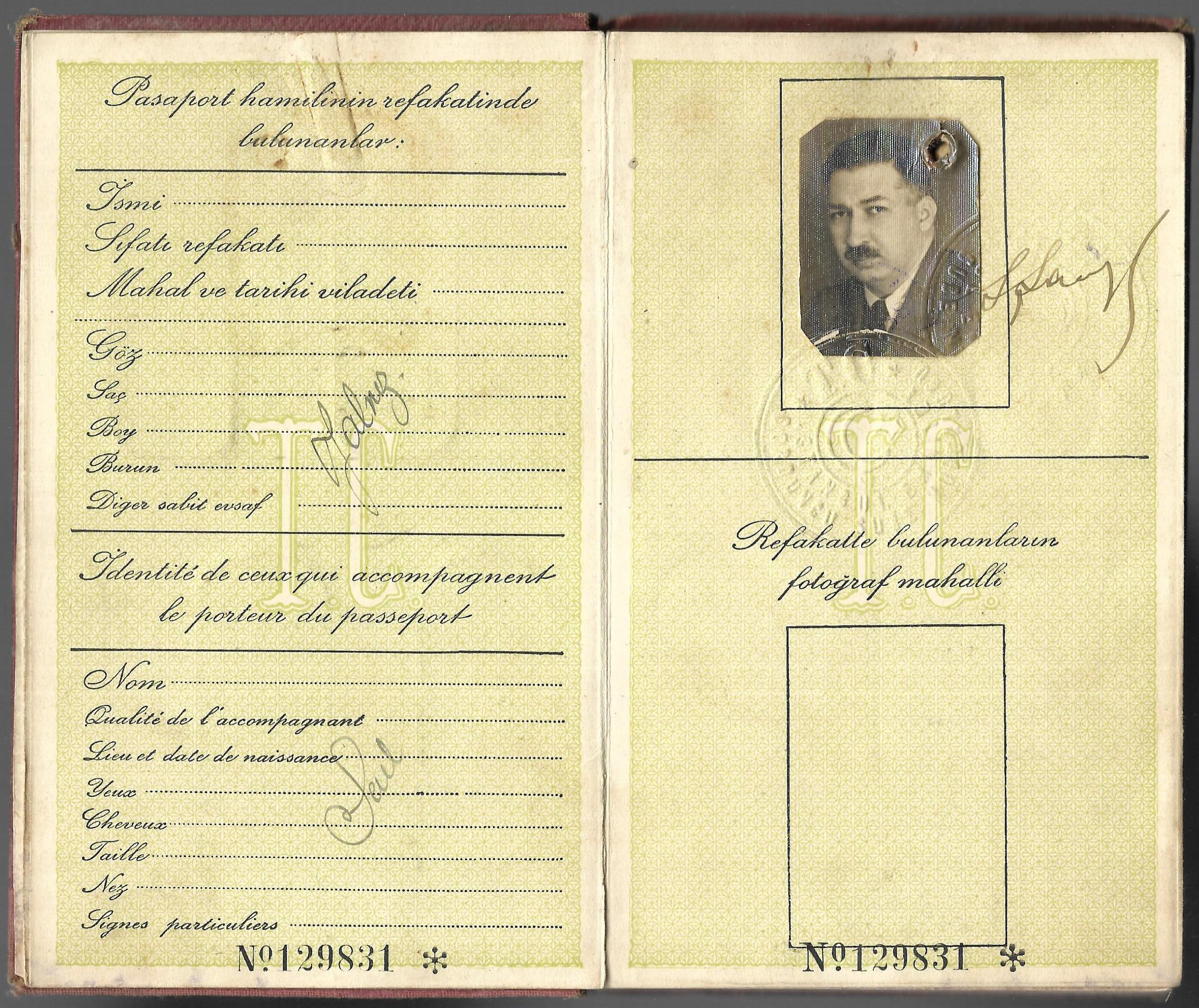
1938 passport issued to Muhammad Said Shamil for Warsaw.

=== World War II ===
Shamil found himself in Warsaw during the invasion of Poland, and he subsequently fled to Beirut. Following Operation Barbarossa, Shamil, like many other North Caucasian émigrés at the time, expressed the hope that the North Caucasus would be granted independence from the Soviet Union. When the Battle of the Caucasus began German forces sought to use propaganda and the existence of the North Caucasian and Mountain-Caucasian legions in an effort to sway Dagestan's population to their side, but were met with unexpected resistance.

Seeking to further their support in the region, the German government brought together around 40 nationally minded intellectuals (including Shamil) and held negotiations at the Hotel Adlon to acquire their support. During the negotiations, Shamil learned that Germany had no intentions to establish an independent state in Dagestan, and instead planned to annex the region. Negotiations continued for six months before Shamil and others sharing his opposition to the annexation of Dagestan left Germany.

=== Post-war period ===
Following the end of the war, Shamil continued to participate in Islamic conferences across the world, speaking on the state of Islam within the Soviet Union. Alongside Baymirza Hayit he was recognised by the Soviet government at this time as the country's "enemy number one" in the Muslim world. Over the course of the next 20–25 years Shamil lived primarily in the Middle East. He also participated in the American Committee for the Liberation of the Peoples of Russia.

In Turkey Shamil's activities were primarily directed towards the preservation of North Caucasian culture. Along with Pshemakho Kotsev, the Mountainous Republic's former Prime Minister, he founded the North Caucasians' Cultural and Mutual Aid Society in 1951. He participated in the Arab League's 1953 meetings, seeking to draw attention to the Soviet policy of population transfer. In 1975 Shamil was one of the founders of the Shamil Educational and Cultural Foundation.

== Death ==
During a 1981 hajj Shamil lost his balance and fell, suffering a concussion. He was hospitalised, and at his request returned to Turkey, where his condition began to worsen. On 21 March 1981, in Haydarpaşa hospital, Shamil died. He was buried alongside his family and Jamal ad-Din Kazimukhsky in the Caucasian Mujahid Shamil section of the Karacaahmet Cemetery. Following his death Shamil's large personal library was handed over to the Shamil Foundation.
