= Tadeusz Pełczyński =

Polish Army major general (1892–1985)

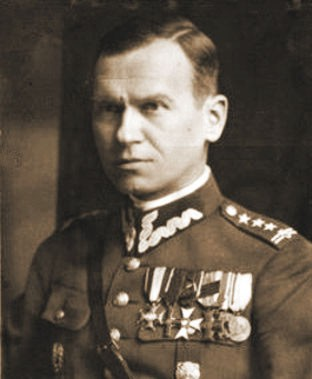
- Colonel (Pułkownik) Tadeusz Pełczyński, ca. 1938
- Born: 14 February 1892; Warsaw, Kingdom of Poland
- Died: 3 January 1985 (aged 92); London, England
- Burial place: Powązki Military Cemetery
- Military career
- Service years: 1915–1947

Tadeusz Walenty Pełczyński (codenames: Grzegorz, Adam, Wolf, Robak; Warsaw, 14 February 1892 – 3 January 1985, London) was a Polish Army major general (generał brygady), intelligence officer and chief of the General Staff's Section II (the military intelligence section).

During World War II, he became chief of staff of the Home Army (ZWZ, Armia Krajowa; July 1941 – October 1944) and its deputy commander (July 1943 – October 1944).

== Early life and education ==
Tadeusz Pełczyński was the son of Ksawery Pełczyński, a Sanniki sugar-mill technician, and Maria, née Liczbińska, a teacher, and was a great-grandson of Michał Pełczyński, a general in the Army of Congress Poland.

Pełczyński began school in Łęczyca. In 1905 he participated in a school strike connected with Polish efforts to win independence from the Russian Empire. He continued his schooling in Warsaw at the Gen. Paweł Chrzanowski Gymnasium. In 1911 he began medical studies at Kraków University. As a medical student he was a member of the patriotic-gymnastic Sokół organisation and of the "Zet" Polish Youth Association (Związek Młodzieży Polskiej "Zet"). He completed a military course conducted by Zygmunt Zieliński, a future Polish Army generał broni (lieutenant general).

== Marriage and family ==
In 1923 Pełczyński married Wanda Filipowska, with whom he had a daughter, Maria, and a son, Krzysztof (Christopher, born 1924, who died during the Warsaw Uprising on 17 August 1944, of wounds sustained on 1 August, the first day of the Uprising).

== World War I ==
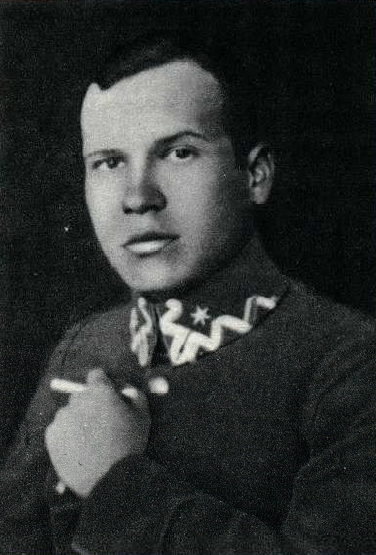
Second lieutenant (Podporucznik) Tadeusz Pełczyński, ca. 1916

The outbreak of World War I in August 1914 found Pełczyński on vacation near Włocławek. After the area had been occupied by the Germans, he was mobilised by them to work as a medic at a Russian-prisoner-of-war camp.

After his release from German service, in June 1915 he joined the Polish Legions. He served as an officer in the 6th Legions Infantry Regiment (6 Pułk Piechoty Legionów) and commanded a platoon and a company. In July 1917, following the Oath Crisis, he was interned at a camp in Beniaminów. In March 1918, after release from internment, he took up work at a social-services agency (Rada Główna Opiekuńcza) while continuing his involvement with "Zet."

== Interwar period ==
In November 1918 Pełczyński was accepted into the Polish Army and placed in command of a company, then a battalion, of the 6th Legions' Infantry Regiment. In March 1920 he was transferred to the Infantry Officer-Cadet School (Szkoła Podchorążych Piechoty) in Warsaw as a company commander, then a battalion commander. From September 1921 to September 1923 he attended the Higher War School in Warsaw. After graduating with a General Staff officer's diploma, he returned to the Infantry Officer-Cadet School as a battalion commander.

In July 1924 he was posted to the Office of the Inner War Council (Ścisła Rada Wojenna). In May 1927 he began service in the Second Department of Polish General Staff (the intelligence section) as chief of the Information Department (Wydział Ewidencyjny). In January 1929 he was appointed chief of Section II. From March 1932 to September 1935 he commanded the 5th Legions' Infantry Regiment (5 Pułk Piechoty Legionów) in Wilno (it was part of the elite 1st Legions Infantry Division), then returned to again head Section II.

As chief of the Second Department of Polish General Staff, Pełczyński, like his predecessor Colonel Tadeusz Schaetzel and like deputy chief Lt. Col. Józef Englicht, was very supportive of Marshal Józef Piłsudski's Promethean project, aimed at liberating the non-Russian peoples of the Soviet Union.

Pełczyński was the longest-serving prewar chief of the Second Department (1929–32, and 1935 – January 1939). In January 1939 he was relieved of this post and placed in command of the 19th Infantry Division (19 Dywizja Piechoty), stationed in Wilno. His tenure as chief of Section II had reportedly been ended by his wife Wanda's political activities against Marshal Edward Śmigły-Rydz and General Felicjan Sławoj-Składkowski.

== World War II ==
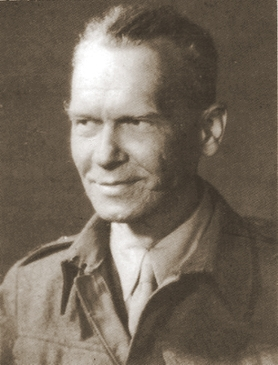
Tadeusz Pełczyński, ca. 1945

Pełczyński may have made his greatest contribution to Allied victory in World War II well before the opening of hostilities, when he proposed giving Polish knowledge of the German Enigma machine to the French and British. According to Colonel Stefan Mayer, "From Gen. Pełczyński, now resident in Great Britain, I know that... he suggested [to the chief of the Polish General Staff, General Wacław Stachiewicz] that in case of [impending] war the Enigma secret... be used as our Polish contribution to the common... defence and divulged to our future allies. [Pełczyński] repeated [this] to Col. Józef Smoleński when in [the] first days of January 1939 [Smoleński] replaced [him] as... head of [Section II]. That was the basis of [Lt. Col. Langer]'s instructions... when he... represent[ed] the Polish side at the [Paris] conference... in January 1939 and then in Warsaw in July 1939.

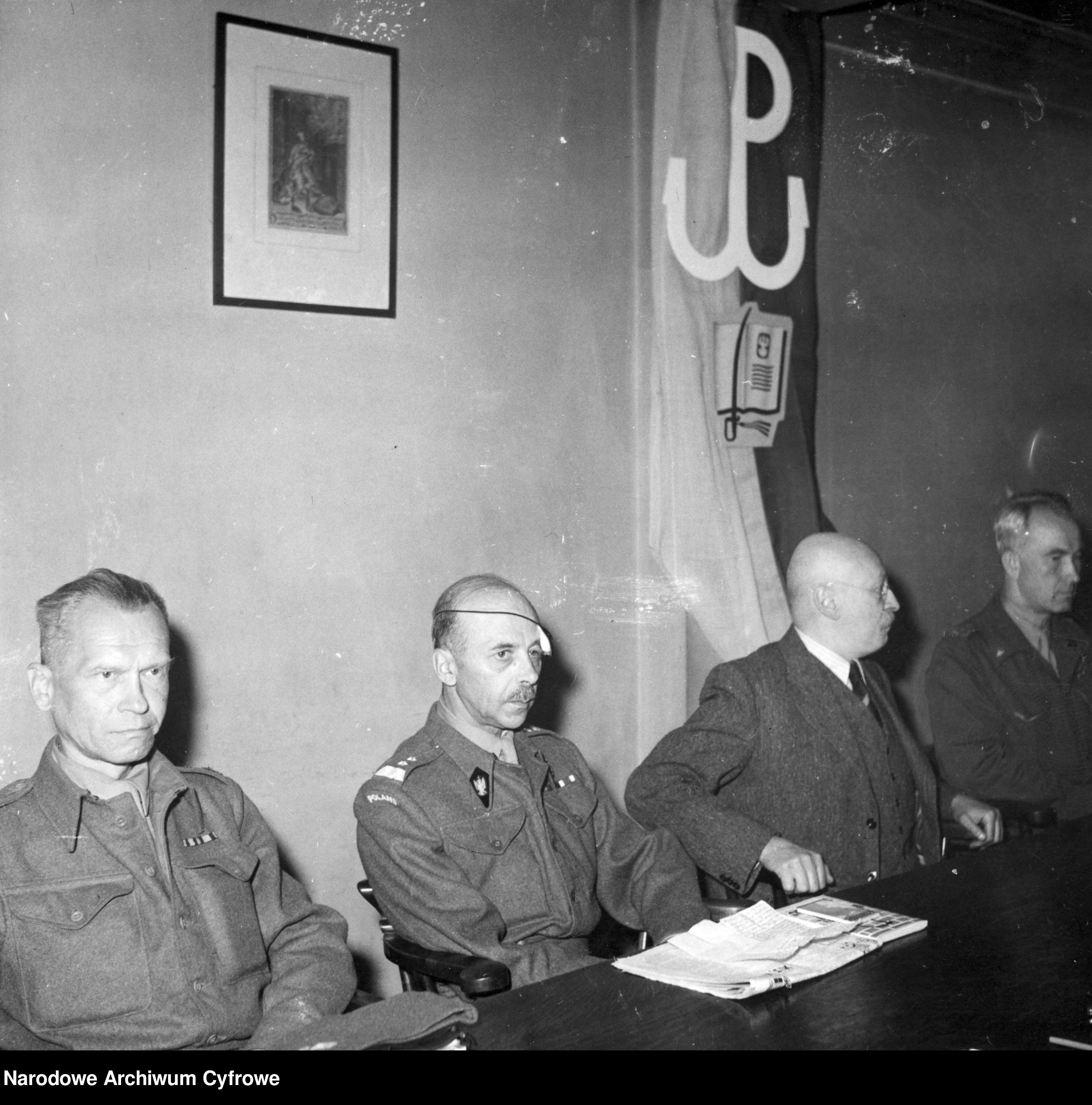
From the left: Tadeusz Pełczyński, Gen. Tadeusz Bór-Komorowski, Adam Pragier, Gen. Antoni Chruściel, during a conference in London, 19 May 1945

The Poles' gift, to their British and French allies, of Enigma decryption at Warsaw on 26 July 1939, just five weeks before the outbreak of the war, came not a moment too soon, as it laid the foundations for later British cryptographic breakthroughs that produced the Ultra intelligence that was a key factor during the war. Former Bletchley Park mathematician-cryptologist Gordon Welchman later wrote: "Ultra would never have gotten off the ground if we had not learned from the Poles, in the nick of time, the details both of the German military... Enigma machine, and of the operating procedures that were in use."

After the outbreak of war, from 5 September 1939, Pełczyński commanded a force in the rears of the invading German Wehrmacht.

After the conclusion of the September Campaign, he went to Warsaw to take up underground work with the Service for Polish Victory (Służba Zwycięstwu Polski), then with the Union for Armed Resistance (Związek Walki Zbrojnej, or ZWZ) and the Home Army (Armia Krajowa, or AK).

From July 1940 to April 1941 he commanded the Lublin ZWZ district. As the local Gestapo were closing in, he returned to Warsaw and accepted the post of chief of staff of ZWZ (July 1941). From July 1943, he was also Home Army deputy commander. In November 1943, he was promoted to major general (generał brygady).

He commanded sabotage operations carried out by Kedyw units against the German war machine (including disruption of several rail lines). He took part in the decision to begin the Warsaw Uprising.

Five weeks into the Warsaw Uprising, on 4 September 1944, Pełczyński was gravely wounded when the PKO savings-bank building on Świętokrzyska Street was bombed, and as a result he could no longer carry on the duties of Home Army chief of staff.

After the suppression of the Uprising, Pełczyński was imprisoned by the Germans at the Langwasser camp, then at Colditz.

== Later years ==
Following his liberation by the Allies in 1945, he made his way to London in England.

== Decorations ==
- Order of the White Eagle
- Gold Cross of the Order of Virtuti Militari
- Silver Cross of the Order of Virtuti Militari
- Cross of Independence
- Officer's Cross of the Order of Polonia Restituta
- Cross of Valor (thrice)
- Gold Cross of Merit
- Home Army Cross

== See also ==
- Biuro Szyfrów
- Edmund Charaszkiewicz
- Prometheism
- List of Poles
