= Józef Englicht =

Polish Army lieutenant colonel and intelligence officer

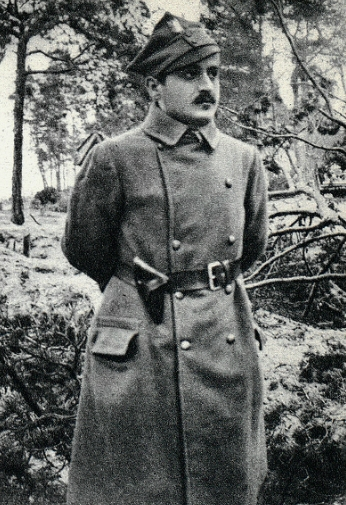
Józef Englicht in Polish Legions.

Józef Englicht (1891–1954) was a Polish Army lieutenant colonel and intelligence officer.

== Career ==
During World War I, Englicht fought in the Polish Legions.

After the first world war, he served on the Polish General Staff's Section II (the intelligence section), eventually becoming its deputy chief. In this position, like the successive Section II chiefs, Tadeusz Schaetzel and Tadeusz Pełczyński, he was very supportive of Marshal Józef Piłsudski's Promethean project, aimed at liberating the non-Russian peoples of the Soviet Union.

From 1937 to March 1939 Englicht commanded the 79th Infantry Regiment, before resuming his post as deputy chief of Section II, in which position he went through the 1939 September Campaign.

Englicht made his way to Great Britain, where in 1942 he was appointed commandant of the Infantry Training Center (Centrum Szkolenia Piechoty) and in 1944 commandant of the Center for Advanced Military Studies (Centrum Wyższych Studiów Wojskowych). From March 1945 he was commandant of the Higher War School.

After the war, in London, he wrote for and edited the Polish military journal, Bellona.

== See also ==
- Edmund Charaszkiewicz#Prometheism
- Prometheism#Cossack affairs
- List of Poles#Intelligence
