= Edmund Charaszkiewicz =

Edmund Kalikst Eugeniusz Charaszkiewicz (Polish pronunciation: [ˈɛdmunt xaraʂˈkjevitʂ]; 14 October 1895 – 22 December 1975) was a Polish military intelligence officer who specialized in clandestine warfare. Between the World Wars, he helped establish Poland's interbellum borders in conflicts over territory with Poland's neighbours.

Also, for a dozen years before World War II, he coordinated Marshal Józef Piłsudski's Promethean movement, aimed at liberating the non-Russian peoples of the Russian Empire and the Soviet Union—an objective that Piłsudski deemed crucial if Poland, sandwiched between Germany and the Soviet Union, were to preserve her just-regained independence.

== Early career ==
Edmund Charaszkiewicz was born on 14 October 1895 in Punitz (in Polish, Poniec), in the Province of Posen, an area of the German Empire that had been annexed from Poland by Prussia in the Third Partition of Poland (1795). He was the son of Stanisław Charaszkiewicz, a building contractor, and Bronisława, née Rajewska. Edmund completed his primary schooling in Poniec, then attended secondary schools successively in Krotoszyn, Katowice and Kraków. In the latter city, before World War I, his family lived at ulica Długa 63 (63 Long Street). In Kraków Edmund graduated from secondary school on 17 December 1915, while already a soldier in the Polish Legions.

In that period, it was common for secondary-school students in Galicia to join Polish patriotic paramilitary organizations. On 1 November 1913 Charaszkiewicz, aged 18, joined the Riflemen's Association and in 1913–14 attended an Association noncommissioned-officers' school, using the pseudonym Kalikst (his second given name).

Soon after the outbreak of World War I, on 4 or 5 August 1914, Charaszkiewicz enlisted in the Polish Legions. He served successively in several units and convalesced from several illnesses. In November or December 1917 he was inducted into the Polish Auxiliary Corps (the former Second Brigade of the Polish Legions), in which he served till February 1918 as senior sergeant major. He was then released from the Legions to serve in the German Army. To avoid such service, and because he was liable to arrest and internment as a former Polish Legionnaire, he went into hiding from 18 February until June 1918 in Kraków, and from November 1918 in Warsaw, where he worked at the Ministry of Military Affairs of the Polish Armed Force. His superiors there were two future Polish generals: Colonel Marian Żegota-Januszajtis and Major Stefan Pasławski.

Just after the close of World War I, on 15 November 1918, Charaszkiewicz joined the Polish Army in the rank of sublieutenant. During the Polish-Soviet War (1919–21) he participated in battles at Švenčionėliai, Pabradė, Bezdonys, Vilnius and Eišiškės. During the Polish defence of Vilnius, he was taken prisoner by the Lithuanians and was interned from 19 July to 18 August 1920. He escaped and, on returning to the Białystok Rifle Regiment (Białostocki Pułk Strzelców), temporarily commanded the 11th Company (21 September – 6 October 1920), then served as a junior officer in the 9th Company. On 27 February 1921, for conspicuous valor behind Soviet lines, he was recommended for Poland's highest military decoration, the Virtuti Militari.

== Military intelligence ==
Meanwhile, on 15 December 1920, Charaszkiewicz had been assigned to the Second Department of Polish General Staff, or Intelligence – specifically, to its Upper Silesia Plebiscite Department. During the Third Silesian Uprising he served (2 May – 15 August 1921) as deputy commander of demolition squads known as the Wawelberg Group. For his courage and steadfastness in action against the Germans, as he blew up mined structures in the face of withering enemy fire and thereby halted the German advance, he was on 18 February 1922 again recommended for the Virtuti Militari. On 27 June 1922, Lt. Charaszkiewicz was decorated with the Virtuti Militari, 5th class.

Charaszkiewicz would later (16 February 1940, in Paris) describe the Polish military-intelligence operation in the Third Silesian Uprising as a model operation of its kind: its objectives were clearly defined; the requisite personnel were skilfully recruited and trained; the necessary explosives, weapons, ammunition, equipment and supplies were smuggled into the operational areas and cached well in advance; and the plans were efficiently and resourcefully executed. He would later favourably contrast the Third Silesian Uprising with the indecisive preparations for, and execution of, Poland's takeover of Trans-Olza 17 years later, in 1938. Moreover, the preponderant political circumstances in Poland, Germany and the world favoured the Polish cause. The Silesian-Polish population gave its enthusiastic support, and all its social groups were recruited except for the communists, who for their part evinced a benign neutrality, having been instructed to back the Polish proletariat.

Between 1918 and 1923, Charaszkiewicz completed three years of the four-year law curriculum at Warsaw University.

After the Third Silesian uprising (2 May – 5 July 1921), in 1922 Charaszkiewicz was assigned to the General Staff's Section II. In evaluations, he was commended for his strength of character, initiative, energy, enthusiasm, and devotion to duty, especially in covert operations in Lithuania, with which Poland had a running dispute over Vilnius. In 1927, when he was decorated with the Silver Cross of Merit, he was cited for actions in the rear of the Soviet Army in 1920, actions in the Third Silesian uprising, and actions in the Polish-Lithuanian neutral zone to secure the lives and property of Polish citizens against Lithuanian irregulars.

Charaszkiewicz's service record noted that his qualifications for intelligence work included a knowledge of German, French and English. He was promoted to lieutenant on 1 June 1919, to captain on 1 July 1925, and to major in 1935.

By 1931, until World War II, Charaszkiewicz served, last in the rank of major, as chief of "Office [Ekspozytura] 2" of the General Staff's Section II. Office 2, which had been so named on 1 April 1929, was charged with the planning, preparation and execution of clandestine-warfare operations.

In the face of growing threats from Germany and the Soviet Union, Polish organizing of a "behind-the-lines" (pozafrontowa) clandestine network had begun immediately after the post-World War I wars for Poland's borders. Charaszkiewicz had been assigned to this network already on 15 April 1922.

Especially after Adolf Hitler's accession to power in 1933, Polish clandestine organizations were vigorously built up. They were meant, in future military actions, to paralyse enemy road and rail transport and destroy enemy military depots. Clandestine centres were created in Poland as well as in neighbouring countries, chiefly Germany and the Soviet Union.

Personnel for the clandestine networks were recruited with great care. Thanks to this, the intelligence services of Poland's neighbours learned nothing about them until mid-1939, when the rising German threat prompted mass Polish training of irregular forces.

== Prometheism ==
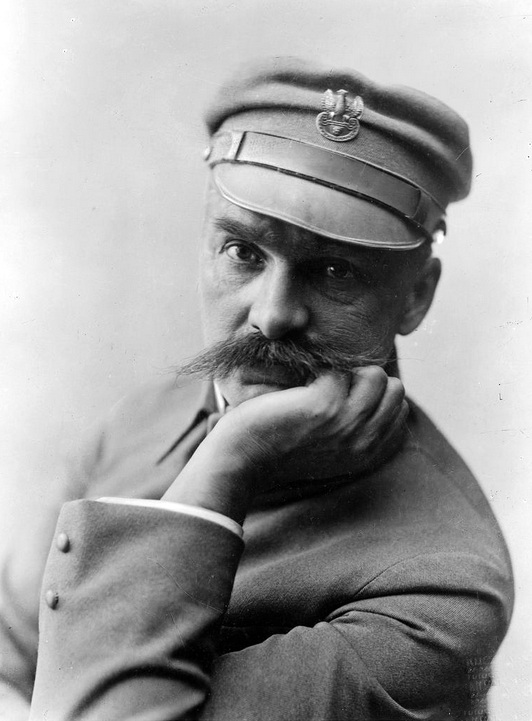
Józef Piłsudski about 1916

Office 2 was also responsible for "Promethean operations," conceived by Józef Piłsudski. The idea was to combat Soviet imperialism by supporting irredentist movements among the non-Russian peoples of the Soviet Union. Thus the Prometheists' ultimate goal was nothing less than the dismemberment of the Soviet Union.

As Piłsudski and his adherents (the "Piłsudskiites") exerted a preponderant influence on Poland's government through nearly the entire interwar period, the Promethean agenda became integral to the operations of many Polish public institutions concerned with eastern European affairs.

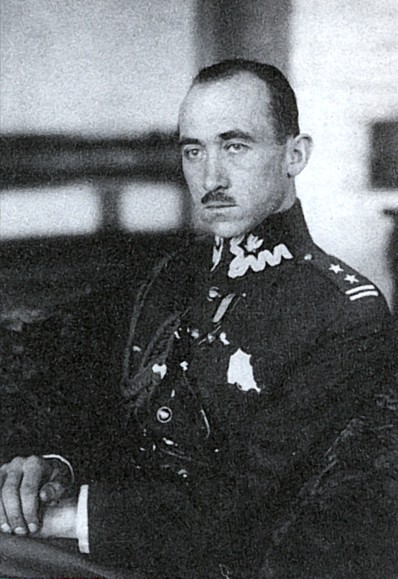
Tadeusz Schaetzel

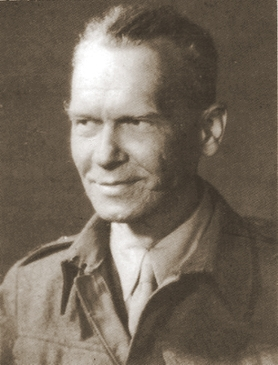
Tadeusz Pełczyński

After Piłsudski's May 1926 coup d'état, Section II intensified its engagement with Prometheism. The movement's leaders included prominent Sanation figures such as Colonel Walery Sławek and the publicist and Sejm deputy, Tadeusz Hołówko. Great importance was attached to Prometheism by Section II's successive chiefs, Colonel Tadeusz Schaetzel and Colonel Tadeusz Pełczyński, and by deputy chief Lieutenant Colonel Józef Englicht. The movement's intelligence operations were directed by Edmund Charaszkiewicz. Contacts were maintained with Ukrainians and Cossacks, and with representatives of several peoples of the Caucasus: Azeris, Armenians and Georgians.

In its prosecution of the Promethean agenda, Office 2 worked with official institutions such as the Institute for Study of Nationality Affairs (Instytut Badań Spraw Narodowościowych) and the Polish-Ukrainian Society (Towarzystwo Polsko-Ukraińskie) and its Polish-Ukrainian Bulletin (Biuletyn Polsko-Ukraiński), published from 1932. The latter Society included such experts on East European affairs as Leon Wasilewski, Stanisław Łoś and Stanisław Stempowski, and its founder and prime mover as well as the Bulletin's editor was Włodzimierz Bączkowski, a leading figure in the "Promethean movement." From March 1934 Charaszkiewicz was a member of the Commission for Scientific Study of [Poland's] Eastern Lands (Komisja Naukowych Badań Ziem Wschodnich) and the Committee on [Poland's] Eastern Lands and Nationalities (Komitet do Spraw Ziem Wschodnich i Narodowościowych) at the Council of Ministers. He had already become a spokesman for the oppressed peoples east of Poland who wished to deepen their national self-awareness and groom leaders for their liberation.

Since 1927, Wasilewski, Sławek, Schaetzel and Hołówko had been laying foundations for Promethean movements in Paris, Warsaw and Istanbul. They had been studying questions involving national self-determination and federative polities with help from academic experts at institutions such as the Eastern Institute (Instytut Wschodni) in Warsaw and an analogous one in Vilnius, as well as at an Institute for Study of Nationalities (Instytut Badań Narodowościowych) and at several publications.

Charaszkiewicz's deputies at Office 2 were two officers from the Third Silesian uprising: Major Feliks Ankerstein (1929–39), who during that Uprising had commanded a group (from 27 April 1921, the subgroup "Butrym"); and Major Włodzimierz Dąbrowski, who had commanded group "G" in the Destruction Office (Referat Destrukcji).

== Covert operations ==
It appears that, as of 1935, Office 2 employed 11 officers, seven of them in Office [Referat] "A" (for the West—Germany, East Prussia, Danzig, Czechoslovakia), headed by Ankerstein, and 22 civilian contract workers. The officer cadre were fairly stable; most of the officers served in Office 2 for at least six years.

A principal task of Office 2 was organizing and conducting clandestine operations outside Poland, chiefly in bordering countries, and preparing resistance cells in areas of Poland that, in the event of war, might be occupied by enemy forces. Office "B" (responsible for the East), headed in 1937–39 by Major Dąbrowski, prepared clandestine actions against the Soviet Union, conducting "Promethean operations" among non-Russian peoples (e.g. Caucasus, Tatar, Ukrainian and Cossack émigrés) and creating covert organizations at Poland's borders with Soviet Belarus and Ukraine. Office "A" (the West) was tasked with preparing and running clandestine operations against "Western" countries of interest.

Agents of Office 2 operated in Germany, Danzig, Czechoslovakia and Lithuania. They also penetrated anti-Hitler German émigré communities in Czechoslovakia and especially in France. In 1935 Charaszkiewicz and Ankerstein organized in the Free City of Danzig a covert "Group Zygmunt", which in September 1939, on the outbreak of World War II, would conspicuously defend the Polish Post Office in Danzig. "Group Zygmunt's" networks were to cover Poland's western border, Pomerania and the Free City of Danzig, and were to concentrate on sabotage and clandestine operations in the event of these areas' temporary occupation by the enemy.

The signing of the German–Polish declaration of non-aggression of 26 January 1934, had produced a reorientation in Polish foreign policy. Czechoslovakia's Trans-Olza area (which was in dispute between Poland and Czechoslovakia) had lain outside Office 2's sphere of interest, but from spring 1934 covert propaganda and clandestine operations began to be developed there.

Charaszkiewicz suggested to an old Polish Legions comrade, Wiktor Tomir Drymmer – from 15 September 1933 to the outbreak of World War II, director of the Polish Foreign Ministry's Consular Department – the creation of an organization covering all countries that harboured substantial Polish communities. They agreed that this would be necessary due to the inevitability of war with Nazi Germany. They were also agreed that the organization was to be strictly covert, both in Poland and abroad; was to be of a nationalist character; and was to be elite rather than large-scale in nature. The organization's regulations were drawn up by Captain Ankerstein.

Eventually it was decided that the organization should be run by a "Committee of Seven" (K-7) comprising half Foreign Ministry personnel – Drymmer, his political deputy Dr. Władysław Józef Zaleski, Tadeusz Kowalski, and the latter's deputy Tadeusz Kawalec – and half Office 2 personnel: Charaszkiewicz, Ankerstein and the latter's deputy, Captain Wojciech Lipiński. Later, Lieutenant Colonel Ludwik Zych, chief of staff of Poland's Border Guard (Straż Graniczna), would be coopted.

K-7 set about recruiting young Poles residing in Czechoslovakia, Germany, Lithuania, Latvia and Romania's Bukovina. They were trained in small groups in Poland, to be deployed in wartime. Beginning in May 1938, K-7 conducted courses in Warsaw, Gdynia and several other Polish localities.

In Trans-Olza, about 1935, the first Polish clandestine operations had taken place; later, during Poland's 1938 annexation of that territory, K-7 members participated. The proceedings were directed from Warsaw by Drymmer and Charaszkiewicz, and on the ground by Ankerstein and later Zych.

After the Trans-Olza takeover, preparations began on 7 October 1938 for a covert operation codenamed Łom ("Crowbar") in easternmost Czechoslovakia's Carpathian Rus, coordinated with Hungarian operations conducted from the south. The Polish commander on the ground was again Major Ankerstein, while at Warsaw Charaszkiewicz was again in overall command. The operation took place in October and November 1938 and helped bring about the First Vienna Award (2 November 1938). In mid-March 1939, the operation's objective was fully accomplished: the restoration of Carpathian Rus to its pre-World War I master, Hungary, and thereby also the recreation of the historic common Polish-Hungarian border.

Six months later, during the September 1939 invasion of Poland, the common Polish-Hungarian border would become of pivotal importance when Hungarian Regent Miklós Horthy's government, as a matter of "Hungarian honor," declined Hitler's request for permission to send German forces across Carpathian Rus into southeastern Poland to speed Poland's conquest. Horthy's refusal allowed the Polish government and tens of thousands of Polish military to escape into neighbouring Hungary and Romania; and from there, to France and French-mandated Syria, to carry on the war as the third-strongest Allied belligerent after Britain and France.

Office 2's next task was organizing "behind-the-lines covert-operation networks" (siatki dywersji pozafrontowej) that were to undertake intelligence, sabotage and covert operations upon the outbreak of war, especially in areas occupied by the Germans. Charaszkiewicz was a conceptual founder of these networks. Particularly intensive work on them began early in May 1939. These structures were given diverse names such as "Secret Military Organization" (Tajna Organizacja Wojskowa, or TOW) and "Mobile Combat Units" (Lotne Oddziały Bojowe). In many cases – in Silesia, in southwestern Poland, and in western Poland – after Poland had been overrun by Germany in September 1939, these networks became the foundations for the first local underground resistance organizations, which in many cases later became part of the Union for Armed Struggle (Związek Walki Zbrojnej, or ZWZ).

One such organization that arose on the foundation of a "behind-the-lines covert-operation network," in Kraków on 22 September 1939, was the White Eagle Organization (Organizacja Orła Białego, or OOB), which soon, in 1940, became part of ZWZ. The OOB was a major organization that, in addition to southern Poland, also held some sway in Silesia, Warsaw and Lublin. The order to form OOB was issued by Charaszkiewicz's deputy, Major Ankerstein, who had returned from Hungary to Kraków expressly for that purpose. He also conducted a three-day covert-operations training for Organization members before making his way back to Hungary and proceeding on to the West.

Before the war, a network of clandestine groups was created, tasked with paralysing lines of communication and destroying enemy supply depots and command networks. Their membership was drawn from varied backgrounds, including the Riflemen's Association (Związek Strzelecki), Reserve Noncommissioned Officers' Association (Związek Podoficerów Rezerwy), Reserve Officers' Association (Związek Oficerów Rezerwy), referrals by County Offices of Physical Education and Military Training (Powiatowe Urzędy Wychowania Fizycznego i Przysposobienia Wojskowego, or PUWFiPW), the Polish Scouting Association (Związek Harcerzy Polskich, or ZHP), the Polish Socialist Party (PPS), and a host of other organizations.

The preparatory work was coordinated by a Department for Planning Wartime Intelligence and Covert Operations (Wydział Planowania Wywiadu I Dywersji Wojennej), created in late 1937. Its tasks included organizing mobilization procedures for the foreign intelligence network and assuring its functioning under wartime conditions, as well as securing covert support for the army at the front.

Spring 1938 saw expanded training of clandestine networks. Courses organized by Office 2, disguised as civil-defense training, might cover cryptology, intelligence microphotography, toxicology, railway sabotage, hand-to-hand combat, new weapons, explosives, and suppression of fires. In view of the enemy's growing preponderance in armour, artillery and especially air forces, it had been decided to increase the tasks set for covert-operations networks. On 3 June 1939 Section II sent, to army commanders, regulations for covert operations; among other things, it was set down that only those members of a covert unit should know each other who were to carry out practically defined assignments.

In summer 1939, weapons and explosives began to be distributed to clandestine centres and patrols. Deliveries were also made to networks created within the Third Reich. Despite the secrecy of the preparations, German intelligence obtained information on the Polish networks, and German security agencies received orders to suppress the Polish networks. When overt war did come in September 1939, the mass terror applied to the Polish population by the Germans, in many instances – though by no means universally – paralysed the Polish clandestine networks.

In September 1939, during the Polish retreat before advancing German forces, Drymmer and other clandestine-operations leaders, as early as their stop at Kazimierz Dolny on the Vistula River, left behind K-7 members and freshly sworn-in individuals. Likewise, at a Polish consulate in Romania's Bukovina, K-7 trained a group of young men in covert action. Major Charaszkiewicz himself, at the outbreak of war, became head of Department (Wydział) F at the Staff of the Commander-in-Chief and carried on this function from 1 to 20 September 1939. According to other information, he was special-assignments officer to the Commander-in-Chief, Marshal Edward Rydz-Śmigły, and in that capacity with the Marshal's approval commissioned the creation of at least one underground organization about 12 September. Next Charaszkiewicz, along with other K-7 members, crossed Poland's border into Romania. There he organized a group of officers who were to return to occupied Poland to set up another underground organization.

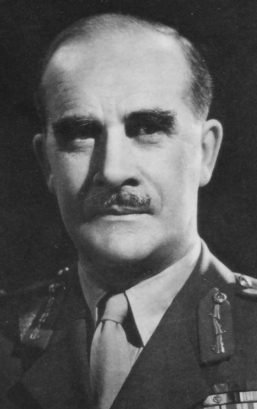
Colin Gubbins

In Romania, Charaszkiewicz established ties with a Sanation group, the "Schaetzel-Drymmer group," that was ill-disposed to Marshal Rydz-Śmigły and supportive of Foreign Minister Józef Beck. Charaszkiewicz also played a substantial role in creating an Office (Ekspozytura) "R" of Polish intelligence headquartered in Bucharest, with satellite outposts scattered about Romania. It was important not only to the conduct of intelligence work but to liaison with occupied Poland.

In Bucharest, in October 1939, Charaszkiewicz received from his British colleague, Lt. Col. Colin Gubbins – soon to become the prime mover of the Special Operations Executive (S.O.E.) – a very warm letter informing him that Gubbins had been personally searching for him, and offering every possible assistance, including financial (Charaszkiewicz declined the money). Through Gubbins' good offices, Charaszkiewicz obtained from the British military attaché a British visa.

== France and Britain ==
Charaszkiewicz never used the visa. On 31 October 1939 he arrived in France, where at first (November 1939 – April 1940) he found himself without assignment at the Bessieres barracks. After a brief stay (April–May 1940) in an officers' camp at Vichy, he joined the Officers' Legion at Niort.

During the "phony war," the new Polish premier and commander-in-chief in exile, General Władysław Sikorski, investigated the causes of Poland's defeat in September 1939. Officers with pertinent knowledge were instructed to submit reports. Probably it was in response to this that Charaszkiewicz drew up the series of intriguing reports in late 1939 and early 1940 that comprise the bulk of his Collection of Documents that was published 60 years later, in 2000.

Sikorski, whose own military and political career in Poland had been stymied while the Piłsudskiites held sway after the May 1926 coup d'état, now sidelined many officers deemed to have been close to the Piłsudskiites. Perhaps that was why an officer as experienced in clandestine warfare as Charaszkiewicz, then only 44 years old, apparently was never again entrusted with such operations.

After France's capitulation (22 June 1940) Charaszkiewicz managed to evacuate to Great Britain. In Scotland he was accommodated at the Douglas officers' camp (July–August 1940), then the Broughton officers' camp (August–September 1940).

He organized, and served as deputy commander, then commander, of armoured trains "C" and later "D" (October 1940 – August 1943) of the 1st Armored Train Command (1 Dywizjon Pociągów Pancernych). On 3 August 1943 he was transferred to the Polish Infantry Training Center (Centrum Wyszkolenia Piechoty), then to the Administrative Department (Oddział) of the Polish Ministry of National Defense. Next, to the conclusion of military operations and till February 1946, he was deputy chief, then chief, of the Information Department of the Inspectorate of Polish Military Headquarters. On 27 May 1945 he was promoted to lieutenant colonel. From February to April 1946 he directed the General Department (Wydział) in the Inspectorate for Civilian Affairs, and in September 1946 he joined the Polish Resettlement Corps. He was demobilized on 11 September 1948 and settled in London.

Charaszkiewicz took an active part in Polish émigré life: in the Piłsudskiite "League for Polish Independence" (Liga Niepodległości Polski) and in the Józef Piłsudski Institute (of which he was for many years president). He founded and for some years edited the institute's periodical, Niepodległość (Independence). He was also prominent in the Silesian Insurgents' Association (Związek Powstańców Śląskich). He continued to be a foremost exponent of Prometheism, whose perhaps most important voice he had been over the many years of his involvement with the movement.

During his career as an intelligence and covert-operations officer, Charaszkiewicz helped pioneer modern techniques of asymmetric warfare. Just before World War II, during a week's visit to London, he shared information on these with Britain's Colonel Holland, Lt. Colonel Gubbins (future leader of the Special Operations Executive), and technical specialists. In his reports about these meetings, Charaszkiewicz noted how far Poland's techniques outstripped Britain's.

He died in London on 22 December 1975.

== Decorations ==
Charaszkiewicz received many Polish decorations, including the Cross of Virtuti Militari (Silver Cross, 1922), the Order of Polonia Restituta (3rd [Commander], 4th [Officer] and 5th [Knight] classes), the Cross of Independence with Swords (1931), the Cross of Valor (Krzyż Walecznych, 1922, three times), the Silver Cross of Merit, and the Silesian Sash of Valor and Merit (Śląska Wstęga Walecznych i Zasłużonych), as well as numerous foreign decorations.

== See also ==
- Akcja Łom
- Feliks Ankerstein
- Wiktor Tomir Drymmer
- History of Polish intelligence services
- List of Poles
- List of guerrillas
- Międzymorze
- Prometheism
- Wawelberg Group
