= Roman Knoll =

Roman Knoll may refer to:

- Roman Knoll (politician), Polish politician and diplomat
- Roman Knoll (Antarctica), geographical feature in Graham Land, Antarctica
