= Wiktor Tomir Drymmer =

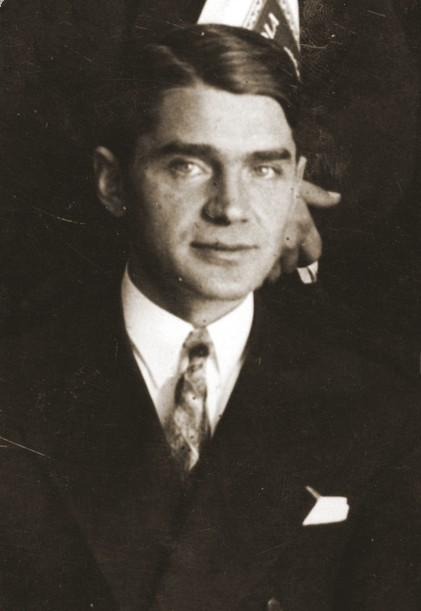
Wiktor Tomir Drymmer, Officer of Polish Intelligence Service and diplomat, died 1975

Wiktor Tomir Drymmer (1896–1975) was a Polish Army colonel and intelligence officer.

== Career ==
During World War I, Drymmer was a soldier in the Polish Legions and the Polish Military Organization.

After the war, he became an officer in Section II (the intelligence section) in the General Staff of the Polish Armed Forces, then an official in the Presidium of the Council of Ministers, director of the Ministry of Foreign Affairs Consular Department, and one of the closest collaborators of Foreign Minister Józef Beck.

During the Interbellum he also became chief of the secret K-7 organization, which had developed from an initiative of Edmund Charaszkiewicz's and which supervised certain Polish covert operations.

After World War II, he remained abroad.

== See also ==
- Feliks Ankerstein
- Edmund Charaszkiewicz
- List of Poles
