= Tadeusz Hołówko =

Polish politician and diplomat (1889–1931)

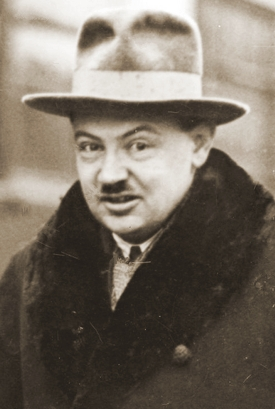
- Born: September 17, 1899; Semipalatinsk Oblast, Russian Empire
- Died: August 29, 1931 (aged 41); Truskawiec, Second Polish Republic
- Cause of death: Assassination by gunshot

Tadeusz Ludwik Hołówko (September 17, 1889 – August 29, 1931), codename Kirgiz, was an interwar Polish politician, diplomat and author of many articles and books.

He was most notable for his moderate stance on the "Ukrainian problem" faced by the Polish government, which due to its nationalist policies in Poland's largely Ukrainian- and Belarusian-populated eastern territories, faced increasing tensions there. Despite, or perhaps because of, being a relative moderate in policies toward the Ukrainian population, and a supporter of peaceful cooperation, he was assassinated in 1931 by two members of the radical Organization of Ukrainian Nationalists.

== Life ==
Born on September 17, 1889, in Semipalatinsk, Governor-Generalship of the Steppes, Russian Empire (now Semey, Kazakhstan), Hołówko became a close collaborator of Józef Piłsudski, first in the Polish Socialist Party (PPS), later in the Polish Military Organization (POW) and finally in the pro-Sanation Nonpartisan Bloc for Cooperation with the Government (BBWR) party and the Polish government (the Ministry of Foreign Affairs). In 1918 he became a vice-minister in the first government of the Second Polish Republic led by Prime Minister Ignacy Daszyński.

One of the organizers of the POW and the BBWR, he was the BBWR's vice president and chief ideologist. From 1930 he was a deputy to the Polish parliament (Sejm); he advocated increasing the presidential and executive powers and decreasing the powers of the Sejm. He is credited by many English and Polish authors for advocating and improving relations with Poland's ethnic minorities, chiefly the Ukrainians and Belarusians. However, certain Ukrainian authors consider otherwise pointing out his opposition to granting autonomy to Ukrainian regions and even to creation of the Ukrainian university in Galicia, as well as to his efforts aimed at convincing the Ukrainian leaders to recall their complaints about pacification submitted to the League of Nations. Modern research however notes he was supportive of giving wide autonomy to minorities and supported their cultural development, for example, by advocating for using the Belarusian language in schools, but not Ukrainian.

Considered one of the ideologists and activists of the "Prometheist" policies that sought to destabilize the Soviet Union by encouraging national uprisings among the non-Russian nations that had been conquered by the Soviet Union, particularly the Ukrainians and the peoples of the Caucasus. Hołówko took an active part in preparing the 1929 Soviet-Polish treaty, also called Litvinov's Pact after the Soviet diplomat Maxim Litvinov. In his published comments to the Treaty, Hołówko stated apparently that contrary to "Prometheian" ideas, Soviet control over Dnieper Ukraine was the most beneficial condition for the Polish "solution of the Ukrainian problem" as any genuinely Ukrainian government would have likely raised territorial claims towards the Polish state. On the other hand, he was frequently cited as an advocate for independence of Ukraine, Belarus and other countries.

His controversial stance towards the Ukrainian problem made him a target for Ukrainian extremists. Approximately 1/3 of population of the Second Polish Republic was formed of ethnic minorities, but their problems were marginalized by the Polish government, whose heavy-handed policies were only serving to antagonize the Ukrainian population. Eventually the extremists among the Ukrainians started sabotage and assassination campaigns, and the Polish government responded with further repressions. Hołówko was one of the few who tried to deal with that problem with negotiations and compromise; he mediated between willing Polish and Ukrainian politicians and proposed various plans to solve the tensions, from releasing Ukrainian prisoners and granting the minorities more rights, up to giving the Kresy regions, inhabited by those minorities, substantial autonomy. However, such pro-Polish Ukrainian politicians were viewed as collaborators by the radical Organization of Ukrainian Nationalists, and Hołówko's stance made him enemies among extremist politicians on both sides, who saw profit in further inter-ethnic conflict.

=== Death ===
He died in Truskawiec (Truskavets) on August 29, 1931, one of the first victims of an assassination campaign carried out by militants of the Organization of Ukrainian Nationalists (OUN). Having experienced heart-related illness, and unable to go to abroad due to financial constraints, he had decided to stay at the health resort of Truskawiec in eastern Poland's Kresy, an area with a largely Ukrainian population. He had, moreover, chosen to stay at a guest house run by Greek-Catholic nuns of Basil of Caesarea (Sorores Basyliae), partly as a declaration of his pro-Ukrainian stance, and partly because it was less expensive. At the news that he had chosen Truskawiec to spend his vacation, the local police commissioner, unable to change Hołówko's mind, assigned a man to shadow him as a bodyguard. August 29 was Hołówko's last day in Truskawiec; unable to leave as planned because he was waiting for a cash transfer to pay for his stay, he was further delayed by a storm. Then in his room he was met by two OUN activists, Vasyl Bilas and Dmytro Danylyshyn, who shot him and left the scene. Danyłyszyn and Biłas were executed for unrelated crimes in December 1932.

His death, widely discussed in the Polish press, and mentioned in the international press and even at a League of Nations session, was part of a vicious circle involving the Polish government's repressive policies towards members of the Ukrainian community (the Polish government's "pacification" campaign) and the OUN's campaign of what has been increasingly described as terrorism. Some time later, the Polish police commissioner in charge of investigating Hołówko's death, Emilian Czechowski, himself became an OUN assassination victim.

== Works ==
- O demokracji, polityce i moralności życia publicznego
- Kwestia narodowościowa w Polsce (1922).

== Quotes ==
- "Influence of communism diminishes with progress... [In a wealthy, educated village], a communist agitator has nothing to do. Thus two things are needed do combat influences of communism: objective, independent and just administration, and cultural work."
- "Independence of Poland is inconceivable without independent Lithuania, Latvia, Estonia, Finland, Ukraine and Belarus. Independence of Poland is only one of many examples of a process seen throughout modern Europe - freeing of nations from political slavery. If Poland is alone, if other countries created on the ruins of Russian Empire will fall - dark will be Poland's future."
- ..."such policies [needs to be used] that ethnic minorities would feel good in Poland, not attempting to break away from Polish state, but on the opposite, they would see such a break away as a defeat. [...] [Thus] those national movements must be supported [...] Therefore that population which would have complete freedom within borders of the Republic would not be loured by Russia."

== Awards and decorations ==
- Silver Cross of Virtuti Militari (20 May 1920)
- Commander's Cross with Star of the Order of Polonia Restituta (posthumously, 9 November 1931)
- Cross of Independence with Swords (6 June 1931)
- Order of the Cross of the Eagle, 2nd Class (Estonia, 1931)

== See also ==
- Prometheism
