= Wacław Stachiewicz =

Polish writer, geologist, and brigadier general (1894–1973)

General Wacław Stachiewicz
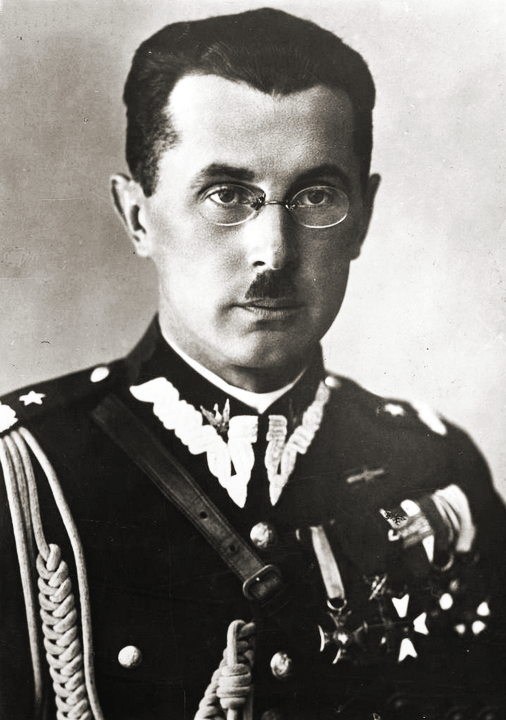

Chief of the General Staff
- In office 7 June 1935 – 18 September 1939
- Preceded by: Janusz Gąsiorowski
- Succeeded by: Aleksander Kędzior (in exile)

Personal details
- Born: 19 November 1894 Lemberg, Galicia and Lodomeria, Austria-Hungary (modern-day Lviv, Ukraine)
- Died: 12 November 1973 (aged 78) Montreal, Quebec, Canada
- Education: University of Lviv
- Profession: Geologist, writer
- Awards: Virtuti Militari V class Krzyz Niepodleglosci with Swords Cross of the Valorous, 4 times Polonia Restituta II Class Polonia Restituta III Class Polonia Restituta IV Class Chevalier Legion Honneur Cross of the Eagle 1st Class

Military service
- Allegiance: Second Polish Republic
- Branch/service: Polish Legions Polish Armed Forces
- Years of service: 1912–1939
- Rank: Brigadier General
- Battles/wars: First World War; Polish–Soviet War

Wacław Teofil Stachiewicz (19 November 1894 – 12 November 1973) was a Polish writer, geologist, military commander and general of the Polish Army. A brother to General Julian Stachiewicz and the husband to General Roman Abraham's sister, Stachiewicz was the Chief of General Staff of the Polish Army during the Polish Defensive War of 1939.

== Early life and career ==
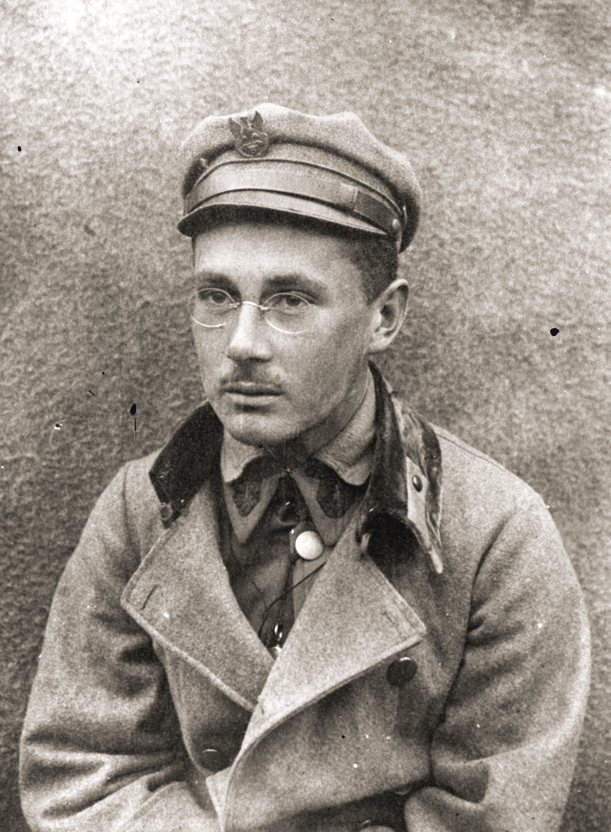
Stachiewicz, 1917

Wacław Teofil Stachiewicz was born 19 November 1894, in Lwów (also known as Lemberg and L'viv), Galicia, Austria-Hungary. After graduating from one of local gymnasiums, he entered the geological faculty at the University of Lwów. In 1912, he joined the underground Związek Strzelecki, where he received military training and graduated from NCO and officer courses.

After the outbreak of the Great War in August 1914, Stachiewicz joined the Polish Legions in which he became a platoon commander in the 1st Regiment. On 9 October, he was promoted to second lieutenant and sent with a secret mission to the other side of the Russo-Austrian Front to help the creation of Polish underground organisations in the territory that was still under Russian occupation. In 1915, he was moved to the newly formed 5th Regiment in which he commanded the 4th company. Wounded at the Battle of Konary, he was moved to various staff duties, such as serving as an aide to the chief of staff of the regiment. In March 1917, he graduated from an officer course of the General Staff and was to be promoted.

=== Oath Crisis and rebirth of Polish Army ===
However, the Oath Crisis of 1917 caused Stachiewicz to be drafted into the Austro-Hungarian Army, demoted to sergeant and sent to the Italian Front. In March 1918, he defected from the army, returned to Poland and joined the secret Polish Military Organisation. He headed its central branch, based in Warsaw. After Poland regained its independence, the organization became one of the cores of the reborn Polish Armed Forces.

Initially serving as the head of the I Detachment of the General Staff and the deputy chief of staff of the Warsaw military district, Stachiewicz soon became a staff officer of General Stanisław Haller's Army. He also served in a number of roles in the Polish Ministry of War Affairs. During the Battle of Warsaw (1920), he served as a deputy chief of staff and chief of operations of General Kazimierz Sosnkowski's Volunteer Army. After the end of hostilities and the Peace of Riga, Stachiewicz returned to the ministry.

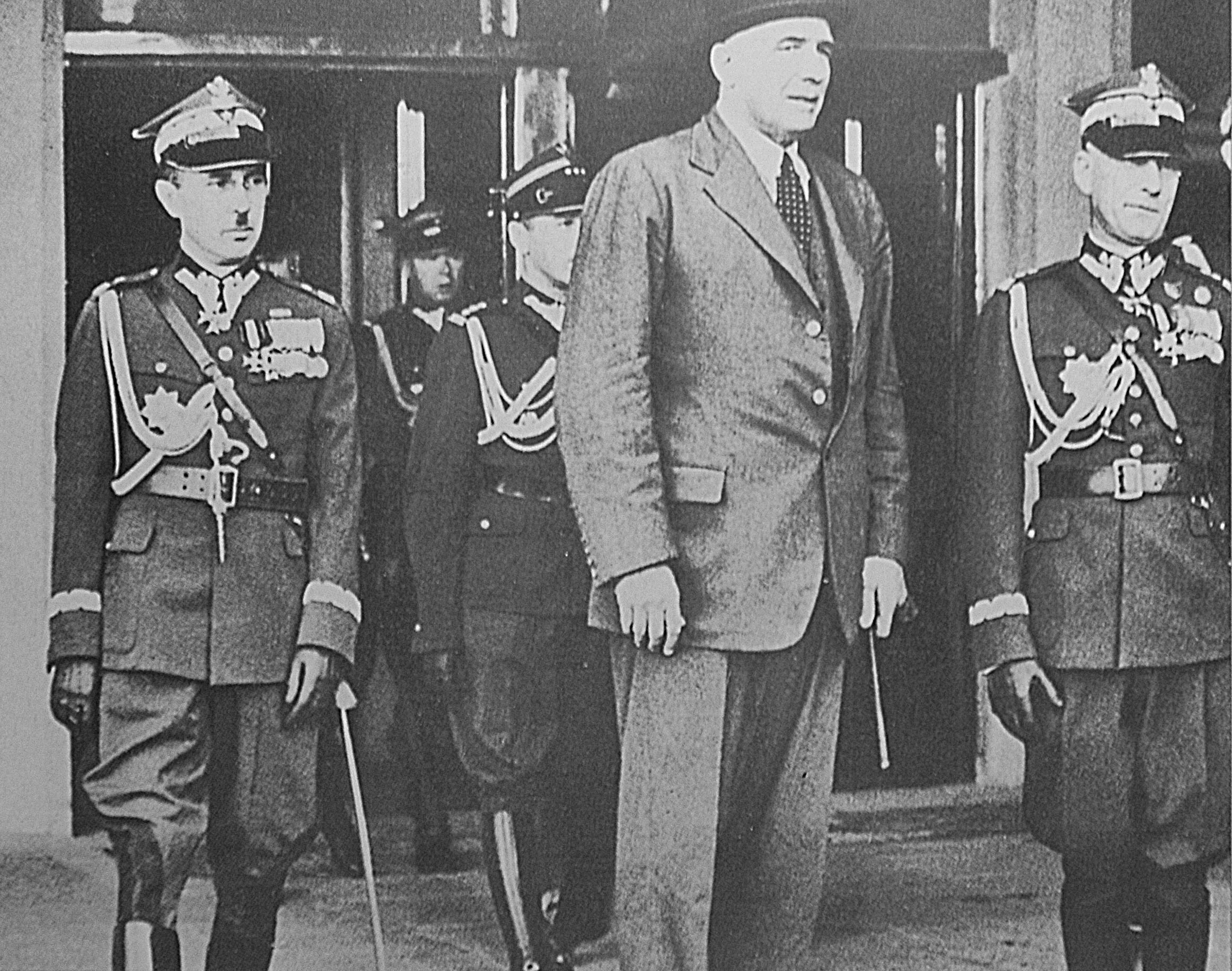
Stachiewicz (left) with Edmund Ironside (centre)

In 1921, Stachiewicz was sent to Paris, where he graduated from the École supérieure de guerre in late 1923. Upon his return, he became a professor of tactics at the Wyższa Szkoła Wojenna in Warsaw. In April 1926, he started a year of practice at the post of head of the 1st detachment of the Polish General Staff. In June 1927, he became the first officer of the Staff of the General Inspectorate of Armed Forces. In January 1928, he completed his practice as the commanding officer of the Częstochowa-based 27th Infantry Regiment. Finally, after a year of training there, he became the chief of infantry in the elite 1st Legions Infantry Division in Wilno. In December 1933, he returned to Częstochowa, this time as a commanding officer of the entire 7th Infantry Division. In 1935, he was promoted to the rank of brigadier general. After the death of Marshal of Poland, Józef Piłsudski, Stachiewicz's place was taken by General Edward Rydz-Śmigły, who nominated him for the post of the Chief of Staff of the Polish Army.

== World War II, exile and death ==
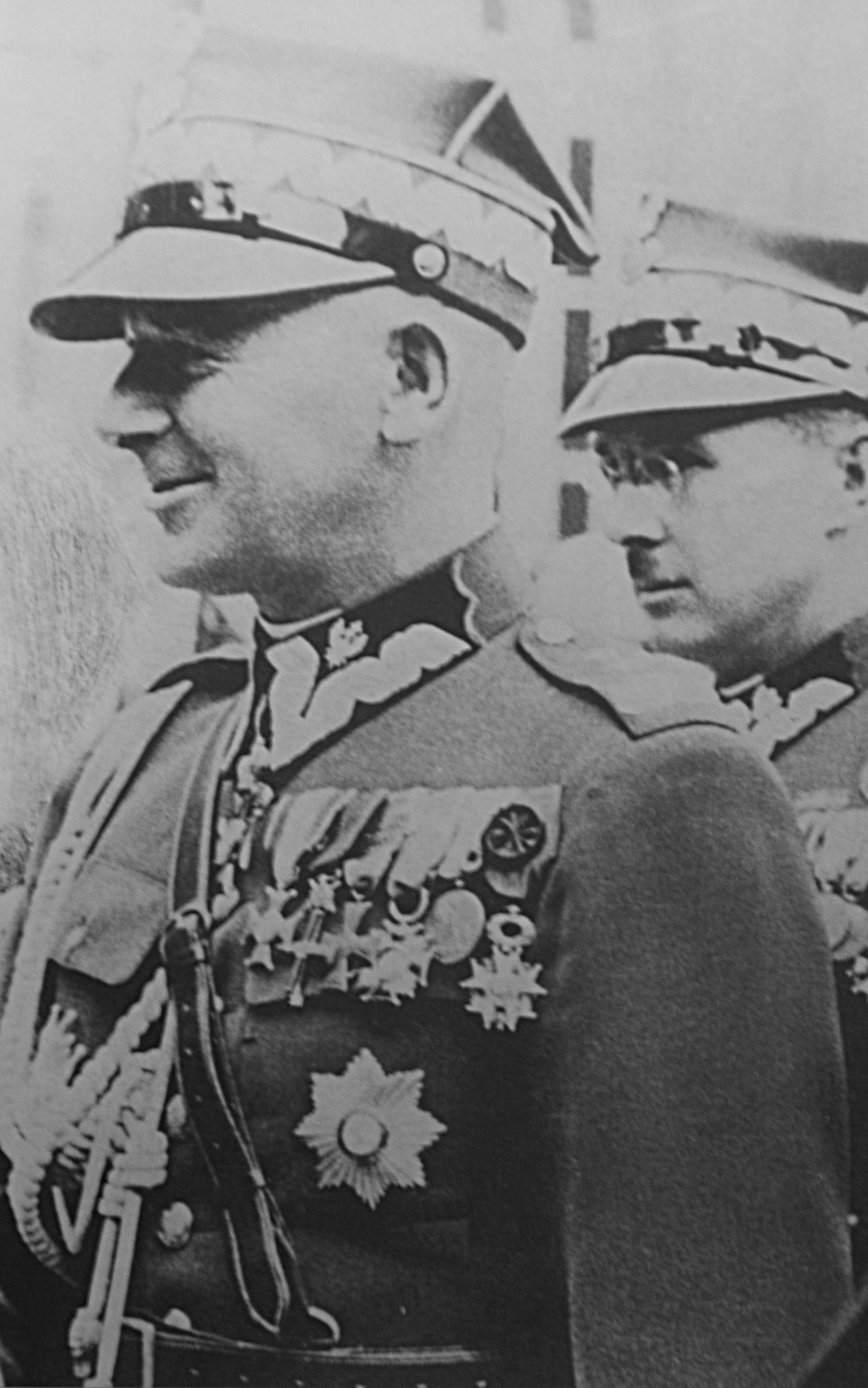
Stachiewicz (right) with Edward Rydz-Śmigły

One of the most promising staff officers in the Polish military, Stachiewicz was the author of various military plans, such as Plan Zachód, the Polish plan of operations in case of a war against Nazi Germany, and Plan Wschód, a similar plan in case of a war against the Soviet Union. He was also the officer to prepare the Polish mobilisation. In late 1939, he supervised the successful mobilisation although it was called off because of British and French pressure. After the outbreak of the Polish Defensive War, he automatically became the Chief of Staff of the headquarters of the Polish commander-in-chief. However, lack of communication made him lose any influence on the conflict, and he and Rydz-Śmigły withdrew to south-eastern Poland. After the Soviets joined the war on the side of the Nazis, he crossed the border on 18 September with Romania to continue the struggle abroad in France. However, internal struggle for power among the Polish emigres made the French pressure the Romanian authorities into interning Stachiewicz and his superior.

In January 1940, Stachiewicz managed to escape from captivity and, through Bucharest and Yugoslavia, reached the French-held port of Algiers. However, General Władysław Sikorski insisted for another internment, this time by the French, and it was not until 1943 that Stachiewicz finally reached London. There, he spent the remaining part of the war without any assignment. After World War II, he was deprived of his Polish citizenship by the Soviet-backed communist authorities of Poland and had to remain in exile.

In 1948, Stachiewicz moved to Montreal, Canada. Blamed by many for the Polish defeat in the war, Stachiewicz devoted himself to writing and wrote several books on the Polish preparations for the war of 1939.

== Death and legacy ==
He died on 12 November 1973 and is buried on Montreal Mount Royal Cemetery. There is a Symbolic grave of Wacław Teofil Stachiewicz at the Powązki Military Cemetery in Warsaw. The Polish Library of the McGill University is named after him.

== Promotions ==
- Podporucznik (Second lieutenant) - 5 March 1915
- Porucznik (First lieutenant) - 2 July 1915
- Kapitan (Captain)
- Major (Major)
- Podpułkownik (Lieutenant colonel) - 11 June 1920
- Pułkownik (Colonel) - 1 December 1924
- Generał brygady (Brigadier general) - 16 January 1935
- Generał dywizji (Major general) - 1 January 1964

== Honours and awards ==
- Silver Cross of the Virtuti Militari (1921)
- Commander's Cross with Star of the Polonia Restituta
- Commander's Cross of the Polonia Restituta (11 November 1935)
- Cross of Independence with Swords
- Officer's Cross of the Polonia Restituta (2 May 1922)
- Cross of Valour – four times (first in 1921)
- Golden Cross of Merit (10 November 1928)
- Commemorative Medal for the War of 1918-1921
- Medal of the 10th Anniversary of Regaining Independence
- Wound Decoration
- Grand Officer of the Legion of Honour (France)
- Knight's Cross of the Legion of Honour (France, 1922)
- Order of the Cross of the Eagle, 1st Class (Estonia, 1937)
- Order of the White Lion, 3rd Class (Czechoslovakia, 1928)
- Commander Grand Cross of Order of the Three Stars (Latvia, 1937)
- Grand Cross Order of the Yugoslav Crown (Yugoslavia)

== See also ==
- Invasion of Poland
- Second Polish Republic

== Bibliography ==
- Stanley S.Seidner (1978). Marshal Edward Śmigły-Rydz Rydz and the Defense of Poland. New York, PIAS.
- Wacław Stachiewicz (1998). Wierności dochować żołnierskiej (Remain faithful to the soldiers). Warsaw, RYTM. p. 832. ISBN 83-86678-71-2.
- Wacław Stachiewicz (1977). Pisma (Works) (Tom 1: Przygotowania wojenne w Polsce 1935–1939 (Part 1: War Preparations in Poland) ed.). Paris, Instytut Literacki. p. 239.
- Wacław Stachiewicz (1979). Pisma (Works) (Tom 2: Rok 1939 (Part 2: 1939) ed.). Paris, Instytut Literacki.
