= Julian Stachiewicz =

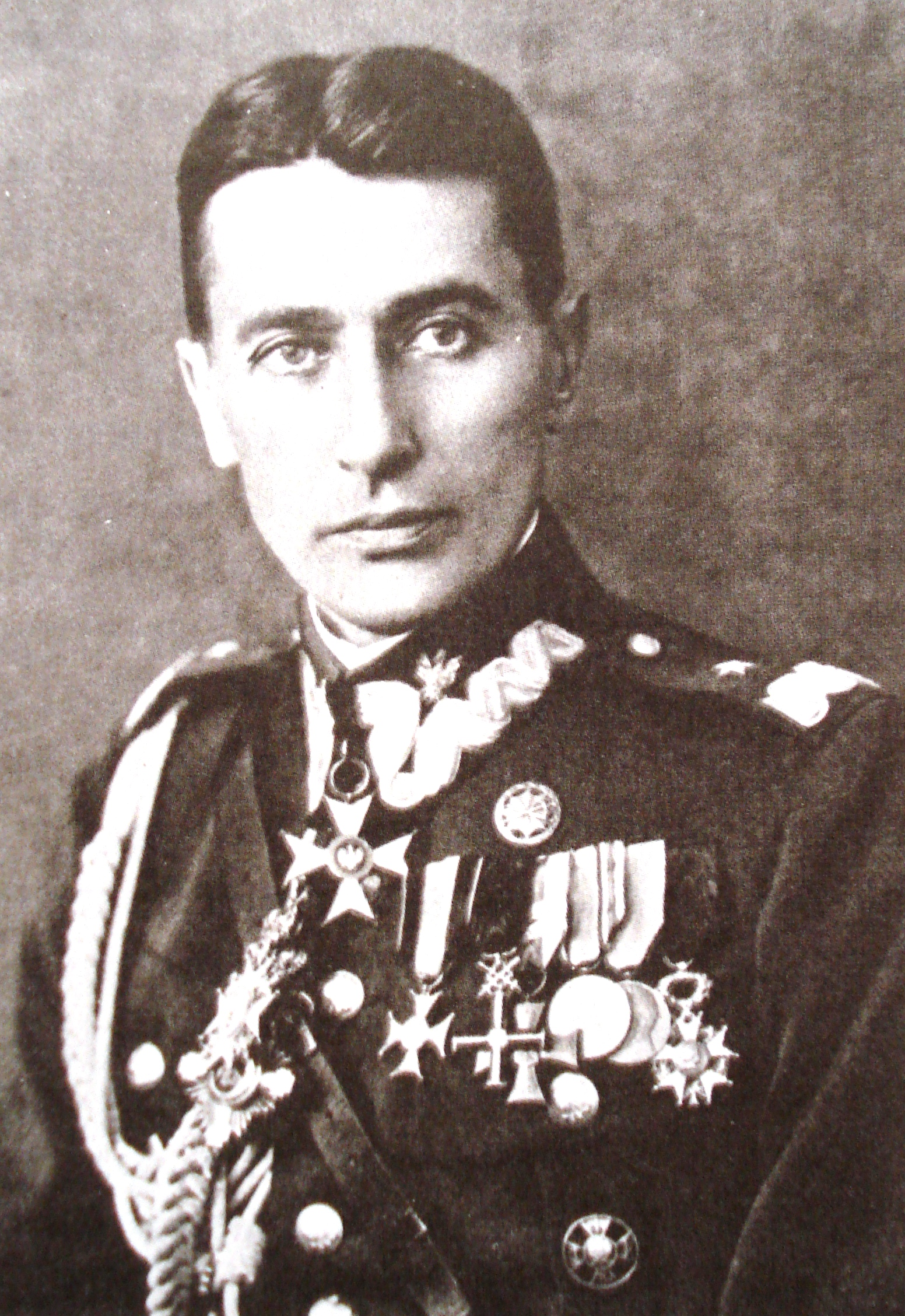
- Born: 26 July 1890; Lviv, Austria-Hungary
- Died: 20 September 1934 (aged 44); Warsaw, Poland
- Military career
- Allegiance: Austria-Hungary; Second Polish Republic
- Branch: Austro-Hungarian Army; Polish Army
- Service years: 1914–1934
- Rank: Brigadier general
- Nickname: Wicz
- Conflicts: First World War; Polish–Ukrainian War; Polish–Soviet War

Julian Stachiewicz (Polish pronunciation: [ˈjuljan staˈxʲɛvʲit͡ʂ]; 1890– September 20, 1934) was a brigadier general in the Polish Army, historian, and writer.

== Life ==
Julian Stachiewicz was the brother of General Wacław Stachiewicz.

Before World War I he joined the Riflemen's Association. In 1914-21 he fought in the Polish Legions, the Polish Military Organization, the Greater Poland Uprising, the Polish-Ukrainian War, and the Polish-Soviet War. He briefly commanded the 13th Infantry Division and in 1923 became head of the Military Bureau of History (Wojskowe Biuro Historyczne), being promoted a year later to brigadier general.

In 1928 he created the Military Historical Review (Wojskowy Przegląd Historyczny), a journal that is published to this day. He was involved with Polish Radio and was a member of academic societies such as the Polish Academy of Learning.

== Awards ==
- Virtuti Militari (V class) (1921),
- Polonia Restituta (IV and III class)
- Cross of Independence with Swords,
- Cross of Valour (four times)
- Golden Cross of Merit
- Order of Saint Sava
- Order of the Star of Romania
- Legion of Honour
- Iron Cross

== See also ==
- List of Poles
