= Tadeusz Schaetzel =

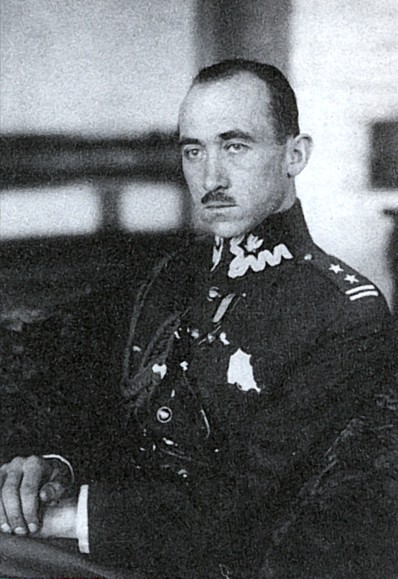
Tadeusz Schaetzel before 1924 as a Polish Army major.

Tadeusz Schaetzel de Merxhausen (1891–1971) was a Polish Army colonel, intelligence officer, Promethean leader, diplomat and politician.

== Career ==
During World War I Schaetzel served in the Polish Legions and as deputy director of the Chief Command of the 3rd Polish Military Organization (KN-3), in Kiev.

After Poland had regained independence in November 1918, he was posted in 1919 to the Staff of the Commander-in-Chief as head of intelligence on Russia in the General Staff's Section II (the intelligence section).

In 1922 he was sent on a secret mission to Switzerland to Turkish General Ismet Pasha, who would become the second president of Turkey in 1938 after the death of Kemal Atatürk. In 1924–26 Schaetzel was military attaché in Ankara, Turkey.

In 1926–29 he was chief of the General Staff's Section II (the intelligence section). In this capacity he was very supportive of Marshal Józef Piłsudski's Promethean project, aimed at liberating the non-Russian peoples of the Soviet Union.

In 1929–30 Schaetzel served as Counselor of the Polish Embassy and Envoy Extraordinary and Minister Plenipotentiary in Paris; next, as Chief of Cabinet to Presidents of the Council of Ministers Walery Sławek and Józef Piłsudski, and (1931–34) as director of the Foreign Ministry's Eastern Department. In 1934–35 he was vice director of the Foreign Ministry's political department. In 1930–38 he was a Sejm deputy (in 1935–38, Vice Marshal of the Sejm).

When the Soviet Union invaded Poland on 17 September 1939, Schaetzel, along with other Polish political and military leaders, crossed the border into Romania, where he was interned in 1939–44 with Foreign Minister Józef Beck. In August 1944 Schaetzel left for Turkey, then Egypt.

From 1947 he resided in Great Britain, where he co-founded the Józef Piłsudski Institute in London and the League for Polish Independence. In 1949 he revived the Prometeusz (Prometheus) group, which he headed.

== Decorations ==
Schaetzel was decorated with the Silver Cross of the Order of Virtuti Militari.

== See also ==
- Edmund Charaszkiewicz
- Prometheism
- List of Poles
