= Roman Knoll (politician) =

Polish politician, diplomat, and Freemason

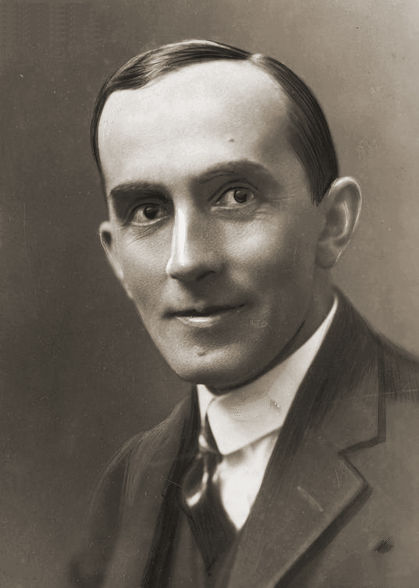
- Portrait of Knoll, c. 1921-1931. From the National Digital Archives
- Born: October 27, 1888; Kiev, Kiev Governorate, Russian Empire
- Died: March 6, 1946 (aged 57); Katowice, Silesian Voivodeship, Republic of Poland
- Education: Saint Vladimir Imperial University of Kiev

Roman Knoll (27 October 1888, in Kiev – 6 March 1946, in Katowice) was a Polish politician, diplomat, and Freemason.
