= Leon Śliwiński =

Polish naval intelligence officer and diplomat (1915–1999)

- Born: 3 November 1915; Moscow, Russian Empire
- Died: 14 September 1999 (aged 83); Paris, France
- Education: University of Oxford (LL.M.)
- Military career
- Allegiance: Poland
- Branch: Polish Navy; Polish Armed Forces in the West
- Service years: 1937–1947
- Rank: Captain (kapitan marynarki)
- Units: Polish Navy; Second Department of Polish General Staff
- Commands: Marine Section, Réseau F-2
- Conflicts: World War II; French Resistance
- Awards: Silver Cross of the Virtuti Militari; Cross of Valour; Gold Cross of Merit with Swords; Chevalier of the Legion of Honour; Croix de Guerre with Bronze Palm; Medal of the French Resistance with Rosette
- Other work: Honorary Consul of the Polish government-in-exile in Casablanca (1951–1990); Shipping and mining executive

Leon Śliwiński (3 November 1915 – 14 September 1999), wartime codename "Jean-Bol", underground alias "Jean Sablon", was a Polish naval intelligence officer and lawyer who served as head of the Marine Section of Réseau F-2, an Allied intelligence network operated in France during World War II by the Second Department of Polish General Staff. Holding the naval rank of captain (kapitan marynarki) in the Polish Navy, he directed the collection of naval intelligence across occupied France until his arrest in December 1942.

Under Śliwiński's direction, the Marine Section of Réseau F-2 developed an intelligence network encompassing the French Atlantic and Mediterranean coastlines. His agents provided blueprints and construction schedules for German submarine pen complexes built by the Organisation Todt, as well as reports on coastal artillery batteries, minefields, torpedo depots, radar installations, and Atlantic Wall fortifications. According to post-war evaluations by the British Admiralty, the Marine Section directed by Śliwiński supplied approximately 80 percent of all naval intelligence originating from occupied France during 1941 and 1942.

Arrested in Nice on 26 December 1942 by the Italian OVRA and military counter-intelligence, Śliwiński was imprisoned in Sanremo and later in the Alpine fortress of Embrun. On 8 September 1943, following the Armistice of Cassibile, he escaped from Embrun and hid in the mountains. In June 1944, he crossed the Pyrenees into Spain, was interned at the Miranda de Ebro camp, and secured release in July 1944 through British diplomatic intervention. Reaching Great Britain via Gibraltar, he served in the Polish Navy Headquarters and the Second Department in London, while graduating with a Master of Laws degree from the Polish Faculty of Law at the University of Oxford in 1945.

Following demobilization in 1947, Śliwiński settled in Casablanca, Morocco, where he served as general director of Warner Bros. for North Africa, established mining and maritime shipping enterprises, and served from 1951 to 1990 as Honorary Consul of the Polish government-in-exile. In his Moroccan businesses, he employed demobilized senior commanders of the Polish Armed Forces and Navy, including Colonel Stanisław Gano and Vice Admiral Józef Unrug.

== Early life and background ==
Leon Śliwiński was born on 3 November 1915 in Moscow into an educated Polish family. (Note: French clandestine records from Réseau F-2 list his date of birth as 3 November 1913, reflecting his wartime forged identification and papers under the alias Jean Sablon.) He was the son of Leon Śliwiński, a Warsaw attorney (adwokat), and Lidia Śliwińska (née Archipow). In 1922, following the end of the Polish–Soviet War, the family returned to Poland and settled in Warsaw.

Śliwiński attended the Marian Fathers Gymnasium (Gimnazjum Księży Marianów) in the Bielany district of Warsaw, where he passed his matura examination. He completed his military training at the Volhynian Reserve Artillery Officer Cadet School (Wołyńska Szkoła Podchorążych Rezerwy Artylerii) in Włodzimierz Wołyński, and subsequently completed naval application courses in Toruń and Gdynia, receiving his commission as a sub-lieutenant (podporucznik marynarki) in the naval reserve in 1937. He began law studies at the Faculty of Law of the University of Warsaw. Prior to the outbreak of World War II, he worked in the film industry as manager of the Roma Cinema (Kino „Roma”) on Nowogrodzka Street in Warsaw.

On 5 January 1930, his father married Władysława Kostakówna (1908–2001), winner of the first Miss Polonia pageant (1929) and runner-up at Miss Europe. During the German occupation of France, Kostakówna worked alongside her stepson in the intelligence network as a cipher clerk and courier under the pseudonym "Maria".

== World War II and Réseau F-2 ==
=== Outbreak of war and recruitment ===
In September 1939, Śliwiński evacuated through Romania, the Kingdom of Yugoslavia, and Italy to France, reaching Paris at the end of the year. He reported for duty to the reconstituted Polish Ministry of Military Affairs (Ministerstwo Spraw Wojskowych). After the fall of France in June 1940, he moved to the unoccupied zone (Vichy), taking employment under cover as a clerk at the Polish honorary consulate in Nice.

In September 1940, the Second Department of the Commander-in-Chief's Staff established Station "F" (Ekspozytura „F”) in France under the command of Major Wincenty Zarembski ("Tudor"). At the same time, naval reserve lieutenant Tadeusz Jekiel ("Doktor") began organizing a naval intelligence network (initially known as Réseau Marine, later transformed into Réseau F-2, where the letter "F" stood for famille). On 1 September 1940, Śliwiński was sworn in as Jekiel's deputy, adopting the wartime cryptonym "Jean-Bol" (combining his French cover identity "Jean Sablon" and his Polish pseudonym "Bolesław"). Following Jekiel's illness in early 1941, Śliwiński assumed direct command of the Marine Section of Réseau F-2 and in 1941 was promoted to the rank of lieutenant (porucznik marynarki) in the naval reserve.

=== Maritime intelligence operations ===
Under Śliwiński's leadership, the Marine Section was divided into regional sub-networks codenamed Edwin, Pascal, Foch, Volta, Vox, Karbo, Filip, Mar, Tor, Rota, and Lao. He expanded its personnel structure by recruiting French naval officers, port workers, shipyard employees, customs officers, and railwaymen. Among those he recruited to the network were Captain Jacques Trolley de Prévaux ("Vox"), later commander of the Mediterranean sub-network Anne, and Wincenty Jordan-Rozwadowski ("Pascal").

Naval intelligence posts covered the Atlantic ports of Brest, Lorient, Saint-Nazaire, La Pallice, Rochefort, and Bordeaux, as well as the Mediterranean ports of Marseille, Toulon, Cannes, and Nice. The section's task was tracking the movements of Kriegsmarine surface vessels and submarines taking part in the Battle of the Atlantic. Śliwiński's agents obtained structural blueprints and construction schedules for reinforced concrete submarine pens built by the Organisation Todt. They also located coastal artillery batteries, torpedo depots, minefields, and radar stations, providing intelligence on the fortifications of the Atlantic Wall.

Intelligence data, after being microfilmed and enciphered, was transmitted to the Second Department headquarters in London by radio, via couriers crossing the Pyrenees into Spain, and through the diplomatic pouches of neutral states. According to post-war assessments by the British Admiralty, the Marine Section directed by Śliwiński supplied approximately 80 percent of all intelligence concerning the German navy originating from occupied France in 1941–1942.

== Arrest, imprisonment, and escape ==
In November 1942, following the Allied landings in North Africa (Operation Torch), German and Italian forces occupied the previously unoccupied zone of France (Case Anton), and control over the French Riviera was assumed by the Italian Fourth Army and the Italian political police OVRA. On 26 December 1942, Śliwiński was arrested in Nice by operatives of the OVRA and Italian military counter-intelligence (Servizio Informazioni Militare, SIM). Following his imprisonment, temporary leadership of the network was assumed by Wincenty Jordan-Rozwadowski ("Pascal"), who made his way to Switzerland in February 1943 and re-established radio contact with the Second Department headquarters in London.

During interrogations in Nice and Marseille, he was questioned by Italian officials and collaborating officers of the German Abwehr, without revealing the identities of his subordinates or cipher codes. He was deported to Italy and imprisoned in the Santa Tecla fortress in Sanremo. In early 1943, he was transferred back to southeastern France and confined in the Alpine fortress of Embrun in the Hautes-Alpes department.

On 8 September 1943, following the announcement of the armistice between Italy and the Allies (Armistice of Cassibile), Śliwiński escaped from the fortress in Embrun and hid in the mountains. He made his way to central France, where he re-established contact with resistance cells. A planned air evacuation to Great Britain was called off due to German patrols over the landing grounds. In June 1944, he crossed the Pyrenees on foot into Spain, where he was detained by the border guard (Guardia Civil) and interned at the camp in Miranda de Ebro. In July 1944, following the intervention of the British Embassy in Madrid, he was released and transported via Gibraltar to Great Britain.

== Service in London and Oxford education ==
In London, Śliwiński was assigned to the Polish Navy Headquarters (Kierownictwo Marynarki Wojennej) and seconded to the Second Department of the Commander-in-Chief's Staff, headed by Colonel Stanisław Gano. He was promoted to the naval rank of captain (kapitan marynarki) with seniority from 1944.

During his stay in Great Britain, he studied at the Polish Faculty of Law at the University of Oxford (Polski Wydział Prawa przy Uniwersytecie w Oksfordzie), graduating with a Master of Laws degree (magister praw) in 1945. Following the end of hostilities in Europe, he was posted to the Polish Military Mission in France, where he worked until 1947 on the liquidation commission, handling the registration, financial settlement, and safeguarding of the archives of wartime intelligence networks.

== Postwar life in Morocco and Spain ==
Following demobilization, Śliwiński remained in political exile and in 1947 settled in Casablanca, Morocco. Until 1963, he served as general director of Warner Bros. for North Africa. He also conducted industrial and shipping activities, founding the mining company Compagnie Minière d'Agadir (CMA), which exploited manganese deposits in southern Morocco, and operating a fleet of merchant vessels, including tankers.

In 1951, the President of the Republic of Poland in exile, August Zaleski, appointed Śliwiński Honorary Consul of the Polish government-in-exile in Morocco, based in Casablanca. He held this post until the transfer of the presidential insignia by Ryszard Kaczorowski in December 1990.

In his enterprises in Morocco, Śliwiński employed demobilized senior commanders of the Polish Army and Polish Navy. Colonel Stanisław Gano worked as an administrator and financial controller in his companies in Casablanca and Agadir until his death in 1968. In Agadir, Śliwiński also employed Vice Admiral Józef Unrug, former commander of the Fleet during the defence of the Polish coast in 1939, who had refused to accept a British military pension.

In the 1970s, Śliwiński retired and moved to southern Spain, settling in the province of Málaga. He organized and catalogued documentation of Polish intelligence in France, transferring the collected operational files, reports, and accounts to the Józef Piłsudski Institute in London, where they were incorporated into the General Stefan Mayer Collection (Fonds No. 100, files 119–124). His accounts and documents formed the basis for the monograph by Jerzy Tuszewski, „Jean-Bol” odkrywa karty. Polska siatka wywiadowcza „F-2” we Francji 1940–1944, published in Warsaw in 2008.

Śliwiński died on 14 September 1999 in Paris at the age of 83.

== Military ranks ==
| Rank | Date of rank | Seniority | Formations and notes | Citation |
|---|---|---|---|---|
| Sub-lieutenant (podporucznik marynarki) | 1937 | — | Naval Reserve, Polish Navy | |
| Lieutenant (porucznik marynarki) | 1941 | — | Naval Reserve, Polish Navy | |
| Captain (kapitan marynarki) | — | 1944 | Polish Armed Forces in the West | |

== Honours and awards ==
=== Polish honours ===
- Silver Cross of the Military Order of Virtuti Militari (No. 11039)
- Cross of Valour
- Gold Cross of Merit with Swords

=== French honours ===
- Chevalier of the Legion of Honour
- Croix de Guerre 1939–1945 with Bronze Palm
- Medal of the French Resistance with Rosette

== See also ==
- Second Department of Polish General Staff
- French Resistance
- Stanisław Gano
- Mieczysław Słowikowski
- Józef Unrug
- Witold Langenfeld
- Jacques Trolley de Prévaux
