= Dwójka =

Dwójka is the Polish word for the number two.

Dwójka may refer to:

- Polskie Radio Program II
- Second Department of Polish General Staff
