= Stanisław Gano =

Polish general and military intelligence chief (1895–1968)

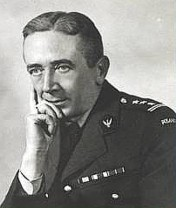
- Colonel Stanisław Gano
- Born: Stanisław Włodzimierz Paweł Gano; 17 May 1895; Opatów, Radom Governorate, Congress Poland, Russian Empire
- Died: 5 July 1968 (aged 73); Casablanca, Morocco
- Burial place: Ben M'Sik European Cemetery, Casablanca, Morocco
- Spouse: Bronisława Władysława Szczepańska (m. 1931)
- Military career
- Allegiance: Russian Empire; Poland
- Branch: Imperial Russian Army; Polish Army; Polish Armed Forces in the West
- Service years: 1916–1947
- Rank: Colonel of infantry (certified); Brigadier general (in exile, 1964)
- Units: 4th Polish Rifle Division; 2nd Legions Infantry Regiment; 84th Polesie Rifle Regiment; 51st Borderlands Rifle Regiment; 11th Infantry Regiment; General Staff
- Commands: Second Department (Chief, 1941–1945)
- Conflicts: World War I Polish–Soviet War; World War II
- Awards: Silver Cross of the Virtuti Militari; Cross of Valour (4 times); Gold Cross of Merit with Swords; Officer of the Order of the British Empire (OBE); Officer of the Legion of Merit (US); Officer of the Legion of Honour (France)

Stanisław Włodzimierz Paweł Gano (17 May 1895 – 5 July 1968), nom de guerre "Stanisław", was a Polish military officer, a certified colonel of infantry of the Polish Army and the Polish Armed Forces in the West, who served from 1941 to 1945 as Chief of the Second Department of the Polish Commander-in-Chief's Staff in London. In 1964, he was promoted to titular brigadier general by the Polish authorities in exile.

During World War I, Gano was conscripted into the Imperial Russian Army in 1916 and later served in the 4th Polish Rifle Division in southern Russia. Joining the reborn Polish Army in December 1918, he served in the 2nd Legions Infantry Regiment and fought on the Lithuanian–Belarusian front of the Polish–Soviet War (1919–1920), receiving the Silver Cross of the Military Order of Virtuti Militari and the Cross of Valour four times. A graduate of the Wyższa Szkoła Wojenna in Warsaw, he served in operational planning and military intelligence, as Polish military attaché to Finland (1933–1935), and in line infantry commands before returning to the General Staff on the eve of World War II.

During World War II, Gano directed Polish military intelligence from London, maintaining liaison with Major General Sir Stewart Menzies of the British Secret Intelligence Service (SIS) and Major General William J. Donovan of the American Office of Strategic Services (OSS). Findings of the Anglo-Polish Historical Committee and British official histories concluded that the Polish Second Department supplied between 43 and 48 percent of all evaluated Allied human intelligence (HUMINT) reports from continental Europe received by the British authorities during the war, overseeing networks such as Agency Africa in North Africa, Réseau F-2 in France, and the technical intelligence that located the Peenemünde and Blizna V-weapon test sites. In July 1945, following Allied derecognition of the Polish government-in-exile, Gano ordered the destruction of the central agent card catalog to protect intelligence operatives from Soviet security agencies, while depositing operational records (known as the "Gano Archive") with the British War Office. Stripped of Polish citizenship by the communist authorities in 1946, he spent his postwar years in Morocco, directing manganese mining operations until his death in 1968.

== Early life and World War I ==
Stanisław Włodzimierz Paweł Gano was born on 17 May 1895 in Opatów, in the Radom Governorate of Congress Poland within the Russian Empire, to Zachariasz Wacław Gano, a local notary public, and Maria Helena (née Mroczkowska). In 1912, he completed his secondary education at the Polish Commercial School in Radom, where he joined patriotic self-education circles, and in 1913 passed the Russian state matura examination in Vilnius. In 1914, he matriculated at the Institute of Ways of Communication in Moscow, completing four semesters of engineering studies while participating in the Polish student mutual-aid society (Bratnia Pomoc) and the Polish House (Dom Polski).

His engineering studies were halted when he was conscripted into the Imperial Russian Army on 15 June 1916. Following reserve infantry officer training, he was commissioned as a praporshchik (ensign) on 20 December 1916. Following the Russian Revolution of 1917, he joined the Union of Polish Military in Armavir in the northern Caucasus in late 1917, organizing Polish soldiers until May 1918, when Bolshevik threats of arrest prompted him to slip across military lines to Warsaw.

In June 1918, learning of Polish units assembling in southern Russia, Gano travelled to the Kuban region, reaching Pashkovskaya near Krasnodar in September 1918. He enlisted as an officer-private in an infantry platoon commanded by Captain Juliusz Zulauf within the 4th Polish Rifle Division under General Lucjan Żeligowski, formed largely from veterans of the Polish II Corps in Russia following the Battle of Kaniów. In November 1918, the division deployed from Novorossiysk to Odesa. On 9 December 1918, while serving in a detachment commanded by Colonel Michał Rola-Żymierski, Gano was captured by Ukrainian forces near Vygoda station; he escaped several days later and reached Chełm in newly independent Poland.

== Polish–Soviet War and interwar period ==
On 24 December 1918, Gano volunteered for the Polish Army as a second lieutenant. After service in the Legions Infantry Inspectorate in Jabłonna, he joined the 2nd Legions Infantry Regiment. On 12 April 1919, he deployed with the regiment's 1st Battalion to the Lithuanian–Belarusian front of the Polish–Soviet War, receiving promotion to lieutenant on 1 December 1919. He served continuously on the front line through 1920, taking part in defensive operations against the Soviet Western Front and the Polish counter-offensive, and as of 1 June 1921 remained on active duty with the 2nd Legions Infantry Regiment. For combat gallantry, he received the Silver Cross of the Military Order of Virtuti Militari (No. 4553) and the Cross of Valour four times.

In 1922, Gano was verified as a captain of infantry with seniority from 1 June 1919 (ranked 1763rd in 1923, 1280th in 1924, and 760th in 1928). From 1 November 1922 to 1 October 1924, he attended the Wyższa Szkoła Wojenna (Higher War School) in Warsaw as part of the III promotion course, while remaining a supernumerary officer of the 84th Polesie Rifle Regiment. After graduating as a qualified General Staff officer, he was posted on 2 October 1924 to Section III (Operations) of the Polish General Staff as a supernumerary officer of the 84th Infantry Regiment, becoming head of an operational desk on 16 December 1925. In 1928, he served in the Second Department of Polish General Staff, remaining in the cadre of infantry officers. On 24 July 1928, he was transferred from the General Organizational Bureau of the Ministry of Military Affairs in Warsaw to Station No. 1 (Ekspozytura Nr 1) of the Second Department of the General Staff in Vilnius. He was promoted to major with seniority from 1 January 1929 in the corps of infantry officers (ranking 71st in April 1931 as a division head in the Second Department of the General Staff in Warsaw, and 65th in 1932), heading Bureau "East" (Referat „Wschód”) at Second Department headquarters from 1929 to 1933.

On 1 May 1933, Gano was transferred from the General Staff and appointed military attaché at the Polish Legation in Helsinki, Finland, with additional accreditation to Estonia. For his diplomatic and military service in Finland, he received the Officer's Cross of the Order of the White Rose of Finland in 1936. In 1935, his given names were formally corrected in military records from Stanisław to Stanisław Włodzimierz Paweł Gano.

Effective 30 June 1935, Gano was placed at the disposal of the Chief of the Personnel Bureau of the Ministry of Military Affairs, and in December 1935 was assigned to command a battalion in the 51st Borderlands Rifle Regiment in Brzeżany. On 19 March 1937, he was promoted to lieutenant colonel (seniority from 19 March 1937, rank 43), and in April became deputy commander of the 11th Infantry Regiment in Tarnowskie Góry. In February 1939, Gano was recalled to the General Staff in Warsaw to head the Independent Technical Section (Samodzielny Referat Techniczny) of the Second Department.

== World War II and Chief of Polish Military Intelligence ==
=== Evacuation and reorganization in France and Britain ===
Following the invasion of Poland in September 1939, Gano supervised document security and communication links for the Second Department during the evacuation. After crossing into Romania, he escaped from an internment camp and travelled to France. At Angers, where the Polish government and military command were reconstituted under General Władysław Sikorski, Gano joined the intelligence staff. Following the fall of France in June 1940, Gano evacuated to Great Britain.

In London in July 1940, the Second Department was established under Colonel Leon Mitkiewicz-Żółtek, with Gano as his deputy. In December 1941, Gano became Acting Chief of the Second Department, and was confirmed as substantive Chief in September 1943, having been promoted to colonel with seniority from 1 January 1943.

=== Allied liaison and strategic intelligence contribution ===
Operating from central London, Gano established liaison with the British Secret Intelligence Service (SIS, MI6), headed by Major General Sir Stewart Menzies, and the British Joint Intelligence Committee (JIC). Under bilateral intelligence agreements, Polish intelligence maintained operational autonomy while transmitting reports directly to British commands. Gano also established operational ties with the American Office of Strategic Services (OSS), conferring with Major General William J. Donovan to supply the American staff with intelligence across continental Europe. Routine liaison with SIS and OSS was coordinated by Gano's chief of the Intelligence Department, Lieutenant Colonel Witold Langenfeld.

Findings of the Anglo-Polish Historical Committee and British official histories concluded that the Polish Second Department supplied between 43 and 48 percent of all evaluated human intelligence (HUMINT) reports from continental Europe received by the Western Allies during World War II. Between 1940 and 1945, Gano's service delivered more than 80,000 evaluated intelligence reports to Allied commands, covering German troop dispositions, industrial targets, naval operations, and advanced weapons development.

=== Major intelligence networks and operations ===
Under Gano's direction, the Second Department commanded networks throughout occupied Europe and the Mediterranean:

- Agency Africa (Agencja „Rygor”): Founded in Algiers in July 1941 by Major Mieczysław Słowikowski ("Rygor") using an oatmeal milling business as commercial cover. The network grew to over 800 agents across Morocco, Algeria, and Tunisia, compiling data on Vichy French troop dispositions, coastal batteries, airfields, and fuel depots, which was utilized by General Dwight D. Eisenhower's planning staff for Operation Torch in November 1942.
- Réseau F-2 in France: Established in July 1940 in France, the Franco-Polish intelligence network F-2 expanded into an extensive Allied clandestine network in Western Europe, numbering over 2,500 registered agents. F-2 provided systematic reconnaissance on German naval bases along the Atlantic coast, including Kriegsmarine submarine pens at Brest, Lorient, Saint-Nazaire, and La Rochelle, as well as structural plans of the Atlantic Wall that informed preparations for Operation Overlord.
- V-weapon intelligence (Peenemünde and Blizna): Gano received and evaluated intelligence transmissions sent from the intelligence branch of the Home Army (Armia Krajowa) in occupied Poland. In early 1943, Polish intelligence identified the German missile testing complex at Peenemünde on Usedom, prompting the Royal Air Force's bombing raid in August 1943 (Operation Hydra). Following the transfer of trials to the Blizna testing range, Home Army scouts recovered unexploded parts of a V-2 rocket near the Bug River, and key components were flown to Britain in July 1944 during Operation Most III.
- Cadix cryptanalytic center: In Vichy France, Gano supported the clandestine decryption center Cadix near Uzès, supervised by Major Gwido Langer and including mathematicians Marian Rejewski and Henryk Zygalski, which decrypted German, Italian, and Soviet traffic until the German occupation of southern France in November 1942.

=== Allied derecognition and destruction of agent records (1945–1949) ===
On 5 July 1945, the British and United States governments withdrew diplomatic recognition from the Polish government-in-exile and recognized the Soviet-backed Provisional Government of National Unity in Warsaw. Effective 1 August 1945, Gano reorganized the Second Department into Section "A" (Situational-Intelligence) and Section "B" (General), with Lieutenant Colonel Leon Bortnowski as his deputy. Following the establishment of the Liquidation Commission on 3 March 1946 (renamed the Documentation Commission on 12 March 1946), Gano succeeded Bortnowski as its head and, from mid-1947, directed the Documentation Commission of the General Inspectorate of the Polish Resettlement Corps in London. In September 1946, he presented British liaison officer Commander Wilfred Dunderdale with a memorandum proposing a post-war organizational framework for Polish intelligence, and until 1949 retained direct oversight over selected post-war intelligence networks in Central Europe, including in Austria.

British authorities requested the surrender of all intelligence archives and agent registers of the Second Department. To protect active and former agents, informants, and couriers across Europe from Soviet security agencies (NKVD and SMERSH), Gano ordered the total incineration of the master agent card catalog (kartoteka agentów) prior to surrendering the intelligence archives, although formal March 1946 liquidation directives had envisaged depositing allied liaison files and intelligence registers with British authorities while destroying materials that could endanger collaborators. Evaluated intelligence reports and operational correspondence (subsequently known in historiography as the "Gano Archive") were transferred to the British War Office (later deposited in The National Archives), while administrative and non-operational files were preserved at the Polish Institute and Sikorski Museum in London.

== Personal life ==
In 1931, Gano married Bronisława Władysława Mieszanowska (née Szczepańska) in the Evangelical-Augsburg Church in Warsaw. In 1940, she was evacuated from German-occupied Warsaw across neutral countries to France by clandestine courier Samson Mikiciński, safely reuniting with her husband.

== Later life and exile in Morocco ==
On 26 September 1946, the Provisional Government of National Unity in Warsaw stripped Gano, General Władysław Anders, and 74 other senior Polish officers of their Polish citizenship, a decree posthumously rescinded by the Council of Ministers in 1971. Following the liquidation of the Second Department within the Polish Resettlement Corps in 1947, Gano relocated to France and subsequently to French Morocco, settling in Casablanca.

In Morocco, Gano entered the mining industry, working in the manganese mining firm Compagnie Minière d'Agadir, headed by his former Second Department subordinate and Honorary Consul of the Polish Government-in-Exile, Captain Leon Śliwiński. Gano served there as a director and financial controller until his death in 1968, managing extraction and shipping in the Anti-Atlas region and providing employment to Polish political refugees and veterans who could not return to Poland.

In the postwar years, Gano maintained contacts with Western intelligence services—serving as an expert on Marshal Bernard Montgomery's staff and corresponding with CIA Director Allen Dulles—while remaining under intensive surveillance by communist Polish intelligence and counterintelligence (Department VII of the Ministry of Public Security, later Department III) from 1948.

On 1 January 1964, General Władysław Anders, acting as Commander-in-Chief within the authorities in exile, promoted Gano to the rank of brigadier general (with seniority from 1 January 1964) in the Polish Armed Forces in the West. Gano died in Casablanca on 5 July 1968, at the age of 73, and was buried in the Ben M'Sik European Cemetery.

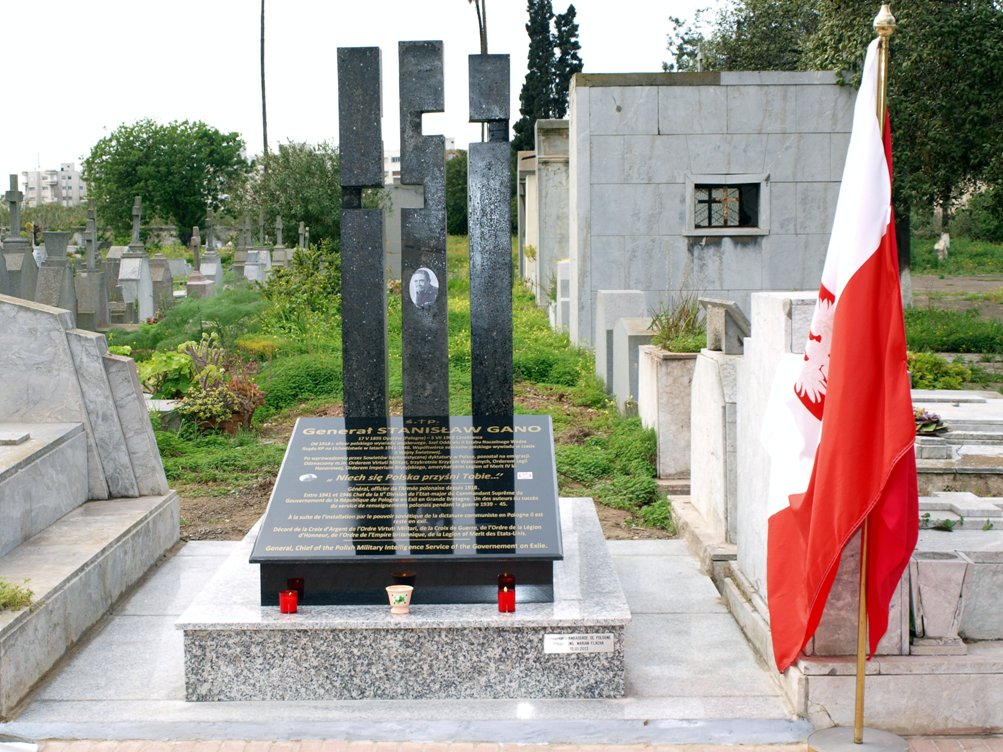
Restored memorial gravestone of General Stanisław Gano at Ben M'Sik European Cemetery in Casablanca, unveiled in 2013

Through the initiative of the Embassy of Poland in Rabat and the Polish Office for War Veterans and Victims of Oppression, Gano's remains were moved to a new memorial plot in 2012, where a redesigned gravestone was officially unveiled on 27 January 2013 in a ceremony attended by Polish, Moroccan, and American representatives, including Office for War Veterans head Jan Stanisław Ciechanowski, Moroccan High Commissioner for Former Resistance Members Mustafa El Ktiri, US Consul General in Casablanca Erica Magallon, and Mayor of Opatów Andrzej Chaniecki.

== Military ranks ==
Rank	Date of rank	Seniority	Formations and notes	Citation
Praporshchik (Ensign)	20 December 1916	—	Imperial Russian Army	
Second lieutenant	24 December 1918	—	Polish Army	
Lieutenant	1 December 1919	—	Polish Army	
Captain	1922	1 June 1919 (rank 1763 in 1923; 1280 in 1924; 760 in 1928)	Polish Army	
Major	1929	1 January 1929 (rank 71 in 1931; 65 in 1932)	Certified General Staff officer	
Lieutenant colonel	19 March 1937	19 March 1937 (rank 43)	Polish Army	
Colonel	1943	1 January 1943	Polish Armed Forces in the West	
Brigadier general	1 January 1964	1 January 1964	Postwar titular promotion in exile	

== Honours and awards ==
- Silver Cross of the Military Order of Virtuti Militari (No. 4553) – 6 December 1921
- Cross of Valour (four times)
- Gold Cross of Merit with Swords
- Medal of Independence – 9 November 1933, "for work in the cause of regaining independence"
- Silver Cross of Merit – 10 November 1928, "in recognition of merits laid in the field of work in particular branches of military service"
- Commemorative Medal for the War of 1918–1921 (Medal Pamiątkowy za Wojnę 1918–1921)
- Medal of the Tenth Anniversary of Regained Independence (Medal Dziesięciolecia Odzyskanej Niepodległości)
- Officer of the Legion of Merit (United States) – 1946
- Honorary Officer of the Order of the British Empire (OBE, Military Division, United Kingdom)
- Officer of the Legion of Honour (France)
- Officer of the Order of the White Rose of Finland (Finland) – 1936
- Inter-Allied Victory Medal (Médaille Interalliée) – 1925

== See also ==
- Second Department of Polish General Staff
- Polish contribution to World War II
- Mieczysław Słowikowski
- Witold Langenfeld
- Karol Piasecki
