= French cruiser Duguay-Trouin (1923) =

1923 Duguay-Trouin-class cruiser

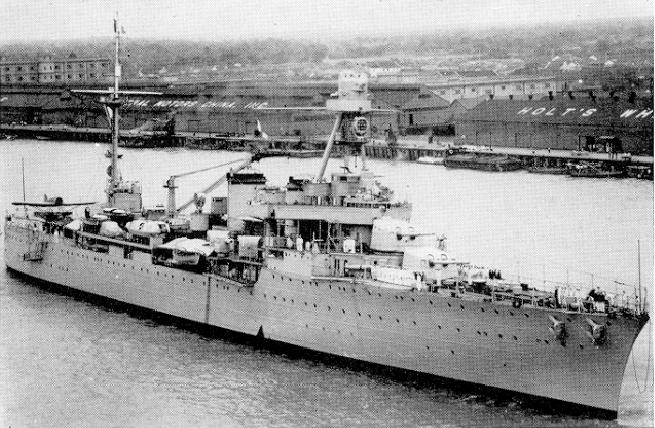
- Duguay-Trouin

History

France
- Name: Duguay-Trouin
- Namesake: René Duguay-Trouin
- Builder: Arsenal de Brest
- Laid down: 4 August 1922
- Launched: 14 August 1923
- Commissioned: 2 November 1926
- Decommissioned: 19 March 1952
- Fate: Scrapped

General characteristics
- Class & type: Duguay-Trouin-class cruiser
- Displacement: 7,249 tons (standard); 9350 tons (full load)
- Length: 181.30 m (594 ft 10 in) (o/a)
- Beam: 17.50 m (57 ft 5 in)
- Draught: 6.14 m (20 ft 2 in), 6.30 m (20 ft 8 in) (full load)
- Installed power: 8 Guyot boilers; 102,000 shp (76,000 kW)
- Propulsion: 4 shafts; 4 geared turbines
- Speed: 33 knots (61 km/h; 38 mph)
- Range: 3,000 nautical miles (5,600 km; 3,500 mi) at 15 knots (28 km/h; 17 mph)
- Complement: 27 officers, 551 sailors
- Armament: Initial; 4 × twin 155 mm (6.1 in) guns; 4 × single 75 mm (3 in) AA guns; 4 × triple 550 mm (21.7 in) torpedo tubes; 1944 refit; 4 × twin 155 mm guns; 4 × single 75 mm AA guns; 3 × twin 40 mm (1.6 in) AA guns; 20 × single 20 mm (0.8 in) AA guns
- Armour: Deck: 20 mm (0.8 in); Magazine box: 30 mm (1.2 in); Turrets and conning tower: 30 mm (1.2 in)
- Aircraft carried: 2 × floatplanes
- Aviation facilities: 1 × catapult

Duguay-Trouin was the lead ship of her class of French light cruisers, launched in the early 1920s. She was named after René Duguay-Trouin. She patrolled the Mediterranean during the Spanish Civil War, and after the outbreak of the Second World War, she hunted Nazi pocket battleships before being interned after the Fall of France and until 1943. She then took part in Allied operations in the Mediterranean, supporting the Provence Landings and shelling Nazi and Fascist troops on the coasts of Italy until the end of the war. Duguay-Trouin then took part in the decolonisation wars in Algeria, and in Indochina.

== Design and description ==
The design of the Duguay-Trouin class was based on an improved version of a 1915 design, but was reworked with more speed and a more powerful armament to match the British E-class and the American Omaha-class light cruisers. The ships had an overall length of 175.3 meters (575 ft 2 in), a beam of 17.2 meters (56 ft 5 in), and a draft of 5.3 meters (17 ft 5 in). They displaced 8,128 metric tons (8,000 long tons) at standard load and 9,655 t (9,503 long tons) at deep load. Their crew consisted of 591 men when serving as flagships.

== Construction and career ==
=== Pre-war ===
Started on 4 August 1922, Duguay-Trouin was the first large unit put on keel in France after the First World War. Launched on 14 August 1923, she was one of the longest light cruisers of the era, which made her a fast ship, capable of sustaining 30 knots for an entire day during trials. She entered active service on 2 November 1926.

After completion, she was assigned to the 2nd Squadron and based at Brest. In 1929, she became flagship of the 3rd Light Division in the Mediterranean and, in 1931, she undertook an extended cruise to Indo-China, then a French colony. Duguay-Trouin returned to the 2nd Squadron at Brest in 1932, this time as flagship, remaining there until 1935.

In 1936, she took part in the international effort to safeguard shipping in the Mediterranean on the backdrop of the Spanish Civil War. For the occasion, the top of her upper turrets was painted in Blue-White-Red colours, to make identification easier and avoid attacks by belligerents.

In 1936, she became a gunnery training ship. The following year, she was modernised, notably fitting a reinforced anti-air artillery. In 1938, she was under the command of Captain de Prévaux.

In June 1939, she joined the 6th Cruiser Division.

=== World War II ===
France declared war on 3 September 1939 as Duguay-Trouin was in Dakar. Along with other French and British ships, she commenced Atlantic patrols to intercept German pocket battleships. On 16 October 1939 Duguay-Trouin intercepted the German merchant ship Halle 200 miles (320 km) south-west of Dakar. Halle was scuttled to prevent its capture.

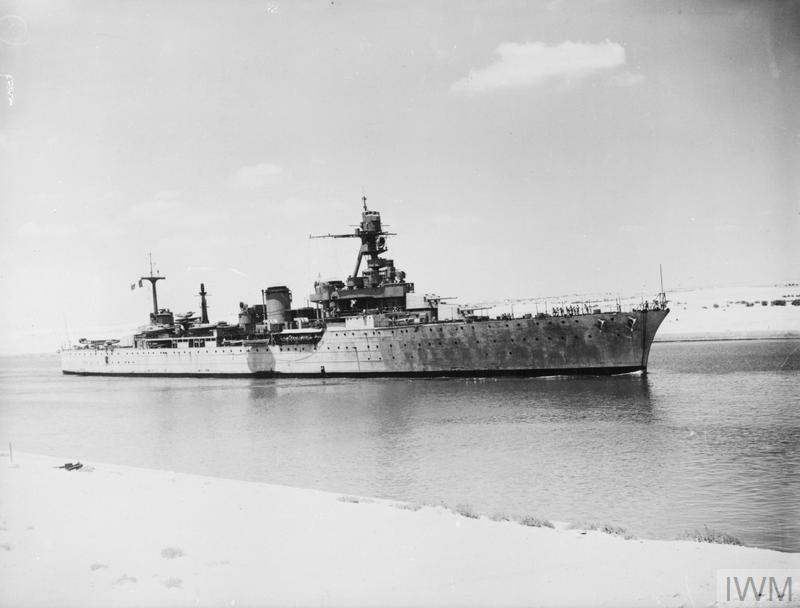
Duguay-Trouin in the Suez Canal, June 1943

In early May, 1940, she was transferred to the eastern Mediterranean, based at Beirut, for operations in the Adriatic and Dodecanese.

In July 1940, after the French surrender, she joined Admiral René-Émile Godfroy's Force X at Alexandria, Egypt; there, she was disarmed by agreement between the British and French admirals during Operation Catapult and interned by the British from 22 June 1940. Axis forces occupying the so-called Free Zone in November 1942 made Armistice terms between France and the Third Reich moot, and Duguay-Trouin rejoined the Allies on 30 May 1943. She was re-armed in July, and after modernisation in Casablanca and Oran, she returned to active service in September 1943. During her refit, Duguay-Trouin had her torpedo tubes and aircraft removed, and instead gained 4 75-millimetre AA guns, 15 20-millimetre guns and 10 13.2-millimetre machine guns.

In March 1944, she ferried troops between Algiers, Ajaccio, Oran and Napoli. She supported the landings in southern France in August 1944 and subsequently undertook bombardments along the Italian coast with the Flank Force until April 1945.

=== Post-war ===
On 10 and 11 May 1945, Duguay-Trouin bombarded villages in Algeria during the Sétif and Guelma massacre, opening fire in ten instances.

On 28 May 1947, with the outbreak of the Indochina War, Duguay-Trouin departed Toulon, bound for the Far East by way of Diego-Suarez in Madagascar, arriving at Saigon on 13 November 1947. She remained in the region until September 1951 as flagship of the Far East Division, supporting landing parties with land bombardment from 1948 to October 1951.

Duguay-Trouin was eventually decommissioned on 19 March 1952, and sold for scrap in 1953, having served one of the longest careers of the warships of her time.

Cruiser Dugay-Trouin, ONI203 booklet, US Navy
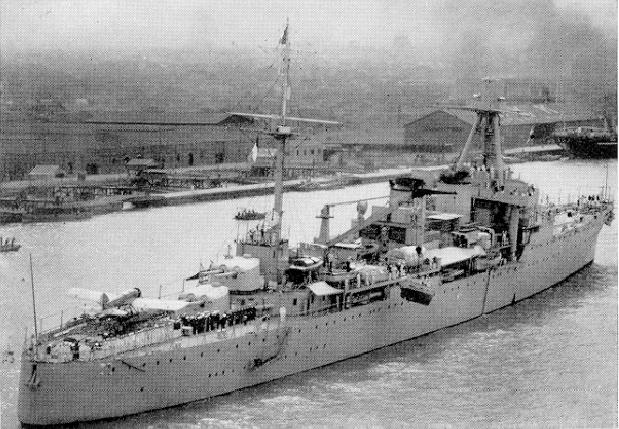
aft of the ship, with aircraft installation visible

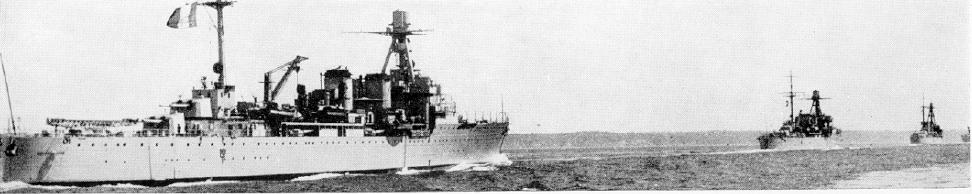
Dugay-Trouin and her sister-ships

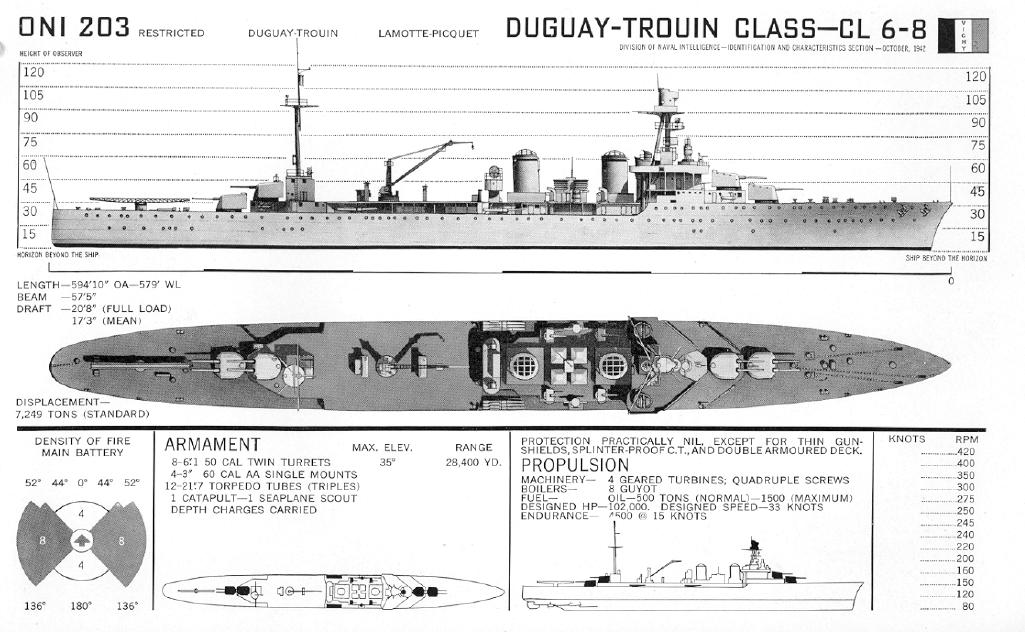
schematics of the ship, pre-refit
