= Second Department of Polish General Staff =

Second Department of the Polish General Staff
- Oddział II Sztabu Generalnego Wojska Polskiego

Agency overview
- Formed: 25 October 1918
- Preceding agency: Section II of the Polish Military Organisation
- Dissolved: 1945 (continued in exile)
- Jurisdiction: Second Polish Republic
- Headquarters: Saxon Palace, Warsaw, Poland
- Minister responsible: Minister of Military Affairs
- Agency executive: Ignacy Matuszewski (1920–1923) Tadeusz Schaetzel (1926–1929) Tadeusz Pełczyński (1929–1932, 1935–1939) Józef Smoleński (1939), Chief of the Second Department
- Parent agency: Polish General Staff
- Child agency: Cipher Bureau

The Second Department of the Polish General Staff (Oddział II Sztabu Generalnego Wojska Polskiego, abbreviated as Oddział II or colloquially known as Dwójka) was the military intelligence, counterintelligence, and cryptanalysis service of the Second Polish Republic between 1918 and 1939, which continued operations under the Polish government-in-exile throughout World War II.

Subordinate directly to the Chief of the General Staff (designated from 1928 as the General Staff of the Polish Armed Forces, Sztab Główny), the Second Department conducted operational intelligence collection against prospective adversaries—primarily Weimar and Nazi Germany, and the Soviet Union—as well as offensive counterintelligence, military deception, and installation security. The department broke Soviet military radio ciphers during the Polish–Soviet War (1919–1920) and achieved the mathematical decryption of the German military Enigma machine in 1932 through its Cipher Bureau, which later provided the basis for the Allied Ultra intelligence program at Bletchley Park.

== History and origins ==
=== Establishment and the Polish–Soviet War (1918–1921) ===
The origins of Polish military intelligence trace to the establishment of the Regency Council's General Staff on 25 October 1918, which included an Information Section (Sekcja Informacyjna) tasked with intelligence and counterespionage. Following Poland's declaration of independence in November 1918, the service was reorganized under the General Staff of the Polish Army, drawing personnel from the underground Polish Military Organisation (POW). In May 1919, it was officially designated as the Second Department of the General Staff (Oddział II Sztabu Generalnego).

During the Polish–Soviet War (1919–1920), the department developed its signals intelligence (SIGINT) branch. In August 1919, Lieutenant Jan Kowalewski established the radiotelegraphic cipher-breaking section. Kowalewski enlisted mathematicians from the Warsaw School of Mathematics, including Stanisław Leśniewski, Stefan Mazurkiewicz, and Wacław Sierpiński, who reconstructed and deciphered the operational radio codes of the Red Army.

Intercepted Soviet traffic provided Commander-in-Chief Józef Piłsudski and Chief of Staff Tadeusz Rozwadowski with advance knowledge of Soviet operational orders and troop movements, including those of Mikhail Tukhachevsky's Western Front and Semyon Budyonny's 1st Cavalry Army. This intelligence contributed to the planning of the Polish counter-offensive from the Wieprz River during the Battle of Warsaw (1920) and the subsequent Battle of the Niemen River.

=== Interwar development (1921–1939) ===
Following the Peace of Riga in March 1921, the Second Department was reorganized into a peacetime intelligence apparatus. Throughout the interwar period, the department's operational activities were organized along two primary geographic axes:

- Vector "East" (Kierunek Wschód): Targeted the Soviet Union, monitoring the Red Army, Soviet industrialization, and conducting strategic and covert operations.
- Vector "West" (Kierunek Zachód): Targeted Germany, tracking German rearmament, military doctrine, order of battle, and fortifications along Poland's western and northern frontiers.

From 1928, the service was subordinated to the Chief of the General Staff (Sztab Główny) and coordinated with the Ministry of Foreign Affairs, placing intelligence officers under diplomatic and consular cover abroad with the cooperation of consular director Wiktor Tomir Drymmer.

== Organizational structure ==
=== Central headquarters (Warsaw) ===
The central headquarters was located in the Saxon Palace in Warsaw, with cryptanalytic sections in the adjacent Saxon Garden. By 1939, the department comprised the following divisions:

- Command and Administration: Chief of the Second Department, Deputy Chief, Adjutancy, General Administration, and Personnel Bureau.
- Department IIa (Offensive Intelligence), headed by Major Stefan Mayer:
  - Bureau "East": Intelligence targeting the Soviet Union, the Baltic states, and Romania.
  - Bureau "West": Intelligence targeting Germany, the Free City of Danzig, and Czechoslovakia.
- Department IIb (Counterintelligence):
  - Sections for General Counterintelligence, Industrial Security, Domestic Ethnic Affairs, and the Central Agent Index.
- Studies Department: Strategic synthesis and analysis of foreign military structures, orders of battle, economics, and armaments production:
  - Section "Germany", headed by Major Jan Leśniak.
  - Section "Russia".
- Cipher Bureau:
  - BS-1 (Polish): Communications security and cryptographic keys for the Polish Armed Forces.
  - BS-2 (Radio Intelligence): Radio interception and direction-finding stations across Poland.
  - BS-3 (Russian): Decryption of Soviet military, diplomatic, and NKVD communications.
  - BS-4 (German): Decryption of German communications, including the Enigma machine section.
- Planning and Special Operations Department: Covert action, irregular warfare planning, and behind-the-lines diversion (associated with the Promethean project), with officers including Edmund Charaszkiewicz and Feliks Ankerstein.

=== Territorial branch network ===
Field intelligence was conducted through regional stations (Ekspozytury), distributed across border regions and operational commands:

Regional Intelligence Stations (Ekspozytury) of the Second Department
Station	Headquarters	Operational Sector / Target	Notable Commanders
Station No. 1	Wilno	Soviet Union (northern sector), Lithuania, Latvia, and Estonia	Major Stefan Mayer, Major Edmund Piotrowski
Station No. 2	Warsaw	Active diversion, covert operations, and the Promethean movement	Major Edmund Charaszkiewicz
Station No. 3	Poznań (moved to Bydgoszcz in 1930)	Germany (northwestern sector, East Prussia, naval and air intelligence, Danzig corridor)	Major Marian Steifer (1924–1927), Major Jan Żychoń (1933–1939)
Station No. 4	Kraków (moved to Katowice in 1930)	Germany (Silesia, Bavaria, Austria after Anschluss) and Czechoslovakia	Captain Karol Franciszek Glazur (1923–1925), Major Adam Studencki (1925–1927), Major August Nowosielski (1927–1928), Major Ludwik Lucjan Sadowski (1928–1931), Lieutenant Colonel Karol Piasecki (1931–1935), Major Kazimierz Szpądrowski (1935–1939), Major Stanisław Kuniczak (1939)
Station No. 5	Lwów (initially Brześć nad Bugiem)	Soviet Union (southern and Ukrainian sectors), Romania, and Hungary	Major Bogdan Szeligowski, Major Józef Bińkowski
Station No. 6	Łódź (formed in August 1939)	Tactical reconnaissance along the central Polish–German border	Major Witold Langenfeld
Danzig Information Bureau (BIG)	Free City of Danzig (1925–1930)	German activity in Danzig, East Prussia, and Pomerania	Major Karol Dubicz-Penther

Territorial counterintelligence was administered through Independent Information Sections (SRI, from Samodzielne Referaty Informacyjne) established at each Corps District Command. Border surveillance along the eastern frontier was coordinated with the intelligence branch of the Border Protection Corps (KOP).

== Major operations and achievements ==
=== Breaking the German Enigma cipher ===
In December 1932, the Second Department achieved the initial mathematical decryption of the German military Enigma machine. In the late 1920s, the German military had adopted a rotor-based cipher machine for wireless communications. While French and British intelligence considered the system resistant to conventional linguistic analysis, the Second Department approached the problem mathematically.

In 1931, Cipher Bureau chiefs Major Gwido Langer and Captain Maksymilian Ciężki established the German cryptanalysis section (BS-4) in Warsaw. They recruited mathematics graduates from Poznań University, including Marian Rejewski, Jerzy Różycki, and Henryk Zygalski. Utilizing permutation theory and intelligence documents obtained by the French from an agent in the German cipher office (Hans-Thilo Schmidt), Rejewski determined the internal wiring of the Enigma rotors in late December 1932.

The team constructed working replicas of the military Enigma machine through the AVA Radio Company in Warsaw, co-founded by cryptanalyst and engineer Antoni Palluth. They designed electro-mechanical decryption devices, including the cryptologic bomb and perforated Zygalski sheets, to recover daily German encryption keys.

On 25–26 July 1939, during a meeting in the Kabaty Woods facility near Pyry south of Warsaw, the Polish General Staff transferred two Enigma replicas, technical blueprints, and decryption methods to British and French intelligence representatives (Alastair Denniston, Dilly Knox, and Gustave Bertrand). This handover formed the basis for the British wartime Ultra cryptanalysis effort centered at Bletchley Park.

=== Intelligence in Germany: Major Sosnowski and Operation "Wózek" ===
Between 1926 and 1934, the Second Department maintained a human-intelligence network in Berlin, designated Outpost "In.3", under Cavalry Captain (later Major) Jerzy Sosnowski. Posing as an anti-Bolshevik Polish aristocrat in Berlin social circles, Sosnowski recruited sources with access to military planning, including Benita von Falkenhayn and Renate von Natzmer, an employee in the Reichswehr Ministry's planning section. The network procured defense documents, including mobilization schedules and the operational war game plan against Poland, known as Organisation-Kriegspiel. Although the network was dismantled by the Gestapo in February 1934, it provided the Polish General Staff with early documentation of German rearmament.

In northwestern Poland, Station No. 3 in Bydgoszcz, commanded by Major Jan Żychoń, carried out counterintelligence and tactical reconnaissance. Its main operation, code-named Operation "Wózek" (Operation "Wagon"), exploited German transit rail traffic across the Polish Corridor connecting mainland Germany with East Prussia. Station agents detached German postal cars during night transit, photographed military documents in trackside facilities, and reattached the cars with duplicate seals before they reached the border.

=== Promethean movement and Eastern operations ===
In the Soviet theater, the Second Department served as the operational coordinator of the Promethean program, conceptualized by Józef Piłsudski to counter Soviet influence by supporting national movements among non-Russian peoples of the USSR. Directed by Major Edmund Charaszkiewicz through Station No. 2 in Warsaw, the program supported political and paramilitary committees representing Tatars, Chechens, Circassians, Georgians, Azerbaijanis, Armenians, and Ukrainians.

The department facilitated passports, communications, and intelligence sharing with exile committees in Paris and Istanbul, while conducting paramilitary training. These operations provided intelligence regarding Soviet military dispositions in the Ukrainian and Belarusian Military Districts.

== September 1939 campaign and evacuation ==
In the months leading to the German invasion of Poland on 1 September 1939, the Second Department monitored the deployment and concentration of the Wehrmacht. Frontier stations—including Station No. 4 in Katowice and Station No. 3 in Bydgoszcz—tracked German motorized and armored troop movements in Silesia, Pomerania, and Slovakia.

Following the outbreak of war, the department headquarters evacuated eastward toward Brześć nad Bugiem and the Romanian border. Cryptanalysts of the Cipher Bureau, including Langer, Ciężki, Rejewski, Różycki, and Zygalski, crossed into neutral Romania in mid-September, avoiding capture, and were subsequently transferred to France to continue cryptanalytic work.

=== Fort Legionów records discovery ===
During the campaign, the German military intelligence service (Abwehr), headed by Admiral Wilhelm Canaris, deployed specialized units under Major Oskar Reile to capture the archives of the Second Department. While evacuated offices in Bydgoszcz were found empty, German search teams discovered evacuated records of the Bydgoszcz station abandoned in Fort Legionów on Zakroczymska Street following the capitulation of Warsaw on 28 September 1939.

The captured records included administrative files and agent rosters of Station No. 3. The discovery led to arrests of Polish informants in northern and western Germany by the Gestapo and Abwehr, resulting in executions, including that of courier Paulina Tyszewska. The loss became the subject of an inquiry by Polish authorities in exile concerning wartime evacuation procedures.

== Continuation in exile (1939–1945) ==
Following the fall of Poland, the Second Department was re-established in France under the Polish government-in-exile led by General Władysław Sikorski. Operating from Château de Vignolles in Gretz-Armainvilliers near Paris, Polish cryptanalysts formed the joint unit PC Bruno alongside French intelligence personnel, continuing decryption of German Enigma communications during the Battle of France in May–June 1940.

Following the French armistice, the service operated from London and the unoccupied Vichy zone (under the undercover station Cadix near Uzès). In Great Britain, the Second Department in exile was directed from December 1941 by Colonel Stanisław Gano and cooperated closely with the British Secret Intelligence Service (MI6), the Special Operations Executive (SOE), and the American Office of Strategic Services (OSS). Polish intelligence maintained networks across occupied Europe, including:

- Réseau F2: Operated throughout France, led by officers including Major Wincenty Zarembski ("Tudor") and maritime intelligence chief Lieutenant Leon Śliwiński ("Jean-Bol"), collecting naval and coastal intelligence along the Atlantic and Mediterranean coasts prior to Operation Overlord.
- Agency Africa: Commanded by Major Mieczysław Zygfryd Słowikowski ("Rygor") in North Africa, which established an intelligence network in Algeria and Morocco that provided military intelligence for Allied landings in Operation Torch in November 1942.
- Diplomatic and Neutral Stations: Intelligence officers in neutral capitals, such as Halina Szymańska in Bern, maintained contact with anti-Nazi circles within the Abwehr.

The Second Department operated until the withdrawal of Allied diplomatic recognition of the Polish government-in-exile in July 1945, followed by its reorganization and progressive liquidation through the Documentation Commission (1946–1947).

== Chiefs of the Second Department ==
Chiefs of the Information Section, Section VI, and the Second Department of the General Staff
No.	Portrait	Name and Rank	Term Began	Term Ended
1		Major Mieczysław Mackiewicz	October 1918	21 November 1918
2		Lieutenant Colonel Józef Rybak	21 November 1918	January 1919
3		Major / Colonel Karol Bołdeskuł	1 April 1919	July 1920
4		Lieutenant Colonel Ignacy Matuszewski	July 1920	28 July 1923
5		Colonel Michał Bajer	28 July 1923	May 1926
6		Colonel Jerzy Ferek-Błeszyński (acting)	May 1926	November 1926
7		Lieutenant Colonel Tadeusz Schaetzel	November 1926	January 1929
8		Lieutenant Colonel Tadeusz Pełczyński	January 1929	February 1932
9		Colonel Teodor Furgalski	February 1932	1934
10		Colonel Jerzy Englisch	1934	October 1935
11		Colonel Tadeusz Pełczyński	October 1935	January 1939
12		Colonel Józef Smoleński	February 1939	September 1939
Chiefs of the Second Department of the Commander-in-Chief's Staff in Exile (1939–1945)
13		Colonel Tadeusz Adam Wasilewski	November 1939	June 1940
14		Colonel Leon Mitkiewicz-Żołłtek	July 1940	December 1941
15		Colonel Stanisław Gano	December 1941	July 1945

== See also ==
- Cipher Bureau (Poland)
- Cryptanalysis of the Enigma
- Enigma machine
- Ultra
- PC Bruno
- Cadix
- Agency Africa
- Prometheism
- Polish General Staff
- Jan Kowalewski
- Jerzy Sosnowski
- Kazimierz Szpądrowski
- Karol Piasecki
- Jan Leśniak
- Stefan Mayer
- Edmund Charaszkiewicz
- Halina Szymańska
- Krystyna Skarbek
- Roman Träger

== Bibliography ==
- Brzeziecki, Andrzej (2021). Wielka gra majora Żychonia. As wywiadu kontra III Rzesza (in Polish). Kraków: Wydawnictwo Literackie. ISBN 978-83-08-07438-1.
- Czarnecka, Regina (2006). "Oddział II Sztabu Głównego (Generalnego) w latach 1921–1939. Zarys organizacyjny i przegląd zawartości inwentarza" (PDF). Biuletyn Wojskowej Służby Archiwalnej (in Polish) (28): 64–105. ISSN 0137-5547.
- Dubicki, Tadeusz; Suchcitz, Andrzej (2018). Oficerowie wywiadu WP i PSZ w latach 1939–1945 (in Polish). Vol. 3. Łomianki: Wydawnictwo LTW. ISBN 978-83-7565-583-4.
- Hinsley, F. H. (1979). British Intelligence in the Second World War: Its Influence on Strategy and Operations. Vol. 1. London: Her Majesty's Stationery Office. ISBN 0-11-630933-4.
- Jastrzębski, Włodzimierz (2021). Major Żychoń i bydgoska ekspozytura wywiadu (in Polish). Bydgoszcz: Wydawnictwo Margrafsen. ISBN 978-83-66844-08-7.
- Kołakowski, Piotr (2023). W obliczu wojny. Polski wywiad wojskowy na hitlerowskie Niemcy 1933–1939 (in Polish). Warsaw: Bellona. ISBN 978-83-11-16502-1.
- Kozaczuk, Władysław (1984). Kasparek, Christopher (ed.). Enigma: How the German Machine Cipher Was Broken, and How It Was Read by the Allies in World War Two. Frederick, Maryland: University Publications of America. ISBN 0-89093-547-5.
- Kozicki, Aleksander (2008). "Oddział Informacyjny Sztabu II Korpusu w latach 1945–1946. Dalsze losy pracowników Oddziału II Sztabu Głównego". Pamięć i Sprawiedliwość (in Polish) (2 (13)): 229–242. ISSN 1427-7476.
- Kozicki, Aleksander (2023). Wywiad Polskich Sił Zbrojnych na Zachodzie (PDF) (in Polish). Warsaw: Agencja Bezpieczeństwa Wewnętrznego. ISBN 978-83-968287-3-6.
- Mazur, Grzegorz (2001). "Sosnowski (Nałęcz Sosnowski) Jerzy (1896–1942)". Polski Słownik Biograficzny (in Polish). Vol. 40. Warsaw–Kraków: Instytut Historii PAN. pp. 556–559.
- Pepłoński, Andrzej (1999). Wywiad w wojnie polsko-bolszewickiej 1919–1920 (in Polish). Warsaw: Bellona. ISBN 83-11-08943-4.
- Pepłoński, Andrzej (2000). "Zarys rozwoju organizacyjnego polskiego wywiadu wojskowego w latach 1914–1945" (PDF). Słupskie Studia Historyczne (in Polish). 8: 179–192. ISSN 1641-9650.
- Pepłoński, Andrzej (2003). "Współdziałanie Oddziału II Sztabu Naczelnego Wodza z Secret Intelligence Service w okresie II wojny światowej" (PDF). Słupskie Studia Historyczne (in Polish). 10: 149–165. ISSN 1641-9650.
- Reile, Oskar (1990). Der deutsche Geheimdienst im II. Weltkrieg. Ostfront: die Abwehr im Kampf mit den Geheimdiensten im Osten (in German). Augsburg: Weltbild-Verlag. ISBN 3-89350-068-5.
- Skóra, Wojciech (2017). Placówki wywiadu polskiego w Chojnicach. Z działalności Ekspozytury nr 3 Oddziału II Sztabu Głównego WP (in Polish). Chojnice: Muzeum Historyczno-Etniczne w Chojnicach. ISBN 978-83-60947-49-4.
- Ulatowski, Łukasz (2013). Polski wywiad wojskowy w 1939 roku. Struktura organizacyjna, składy osobowe, personel, budżet, mob (in Polish). Warsaw: Łukasz Ulatowski. ISBN 978-83-938229-2-8.
- Woźny, Aleksander (2025). "Kapitan/major dypl. Kazimierz Szpądrowski – droga do służby w Oddziale II SG (1932) i Ekspozyturze nr 4 (1935)". In Dubicki, Tadeusz (ed.). Wywiad i kontrwywiad wojskowy II RP (in Polish). Vol. 14. Łomianki: Wydawnictwo LTW. pp. 227–235. ISBN 978-83-7565-928-3.
- Woytak, Richard A. (1984). "The Promethean Movement in Interwar Poland: An Aspect of Polish Intelligence Operations, 1928–1939". East European Quarterly. 18 (3): 273–278.
- Zgórniak, Marian (1970). "„IN-3". Sprawa Jerzego Sosnowskiego". Studia Historyczne (in Polish). 13 (4): 537–547.
