= Józef Smoleński =

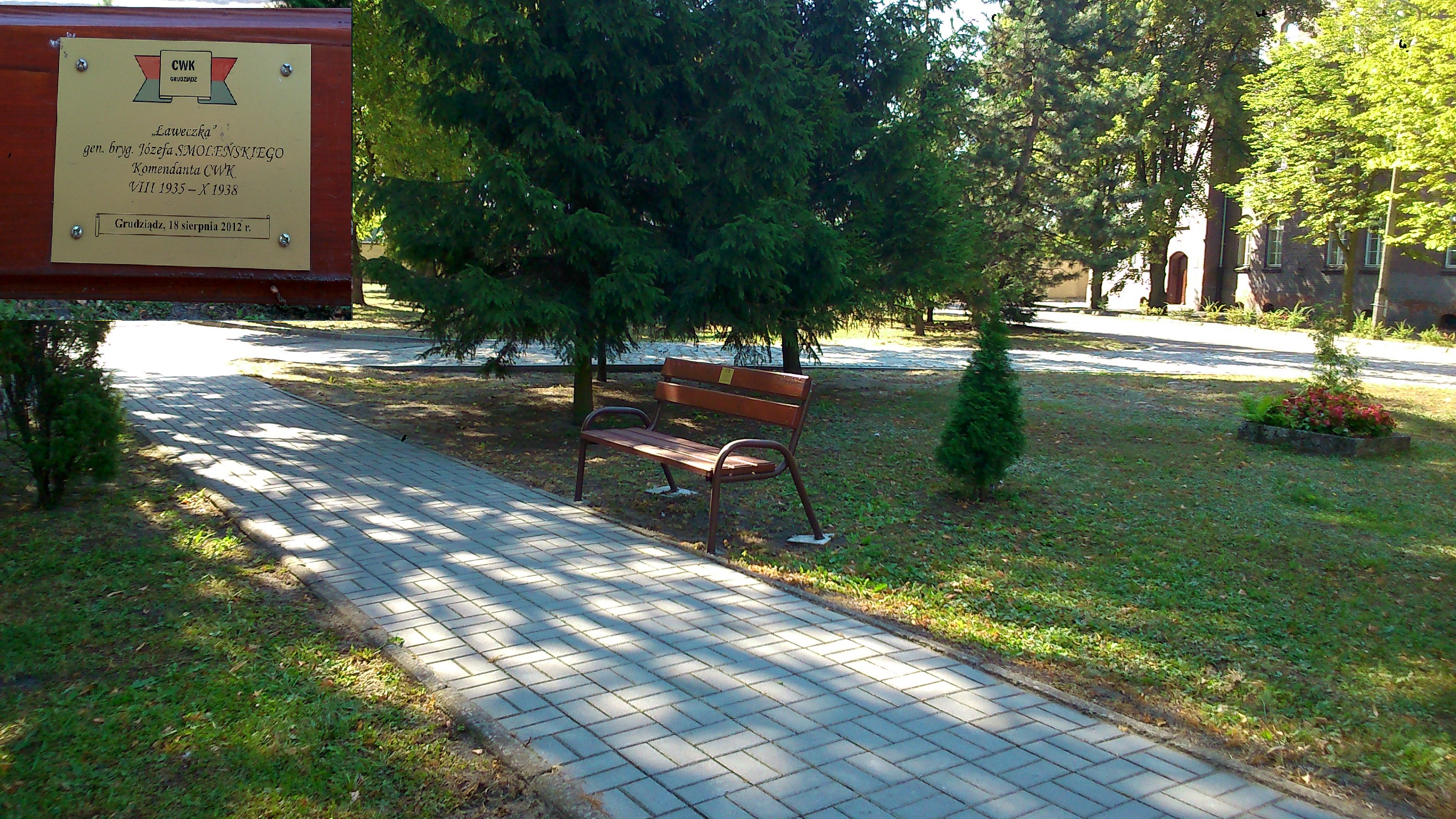
Plaque on bench memorising general in former barracks of Cavalry Training Center in Grudziądz

Józef Smoleński (1894–1978) was a soldier of Polish Legions in World War I and General brygady of the Polish Army. He fought in World War I, Polish–Soviet War and World War II, serving in the military forces from 1914 until 1945.

Born on 18 September 1894 in the village of Gostkowo, Russian-controlled Congress Poland, Smoleński studied at the University of Liège, Belgium, and at Warsaw University of Life Sciences, where he joined the Riflemen's Association and moved from Congress Poland to Austrian Galicia.

On 6 August 1914 Smoleński marched from Kraków towards Russian Poland, as a soldier of 2nd Platoon, First Cadre Company. He then served in the 1st Uhlan Regiment of Władysław Belina-Prażmowski. After the Oath crisis, he was interned by the Germans in Szczypiorno, to be released in November 1918. Smoleński then joined the newly created Polish Army, serving until September 1922 in the 7th Lublin Uhlan Regiment. He then studied at Wyższa Szkoła Wojenna in Warsaw. After graduation, he became officer of the Polish General Staff, and in 1925–1928 served in the 4th Cavalry Division in Lwów.

In May 1930, Smoleński was named commandant of the 2nd Grochow Uhlan Regiment, stationed in Suwałki. In August 1935 he was sent to the Cavalry Training Center in Grudziądz, which he commanded until November 1938. In February 1939, Smoleński became head of the Second Department of Polish General Staff.

After the 1939 invasion of Poland, Smolenski managed to escape to France. In May 1940, General Władysław Sikorski appointed him deputy of General Kazimierz Sosnkowski, commandant of the Union of Armed Struggle. Using nom de guerre Lukasz, Smoleński was responsible for sabotage and planning of an armed uprising in occupied Poland. In August 1940, after the collapse of France, he came to London, and was named commandant of Second Department of the General Staff. He was one of the main advisers of General Sosnkowski. In 1941–1945, he held different posts in the Polish Armed Forces in the West, including command of the 3rd Carpathian Rifle Division. After the war, he was an active member of Polish community and chair of Józef Piłsudski Institute in London. On 1 January 1964 he was promoted to the rank of General brygady by the government in exile.

Józef Smoleński died in London in a trafic accident on 19 January 1978 and was buried at Gunnersbury Cemetery.

His grandson Stéphane Crouzat is a French diplomat (ambassador of France to Ireland, 2017-2020, and to the Czech Republic from 2024).

== Awards ==
- Silver Cross of the Virtuti Militari (1921),
- Commander's Cross of the Order of Polonia Restituta,
- Cross of Independence (1931),
- Cross of Valour (Poland)
- Gold Cross of Merit (Poland),
- Commander's Cross of the Order of the Cross of the Eagle (Estonia, 1937).

== See also ==
- Tadeusz Pełczyński
- Prometheism

== Sources ==
- Grzegorz Nowik i Maciej Smolenski, Ósmy Ułan Beliny. Generał brygady Józef Marian Smoleński "Kolec" (1894–1978), Oficyna Wydawnicza RYTM, 2008, ISBN 978-83-7399-291-7.
