= Hôtel de Ville, Bron =

Town hall in Bron, France

Hôtel de Ville
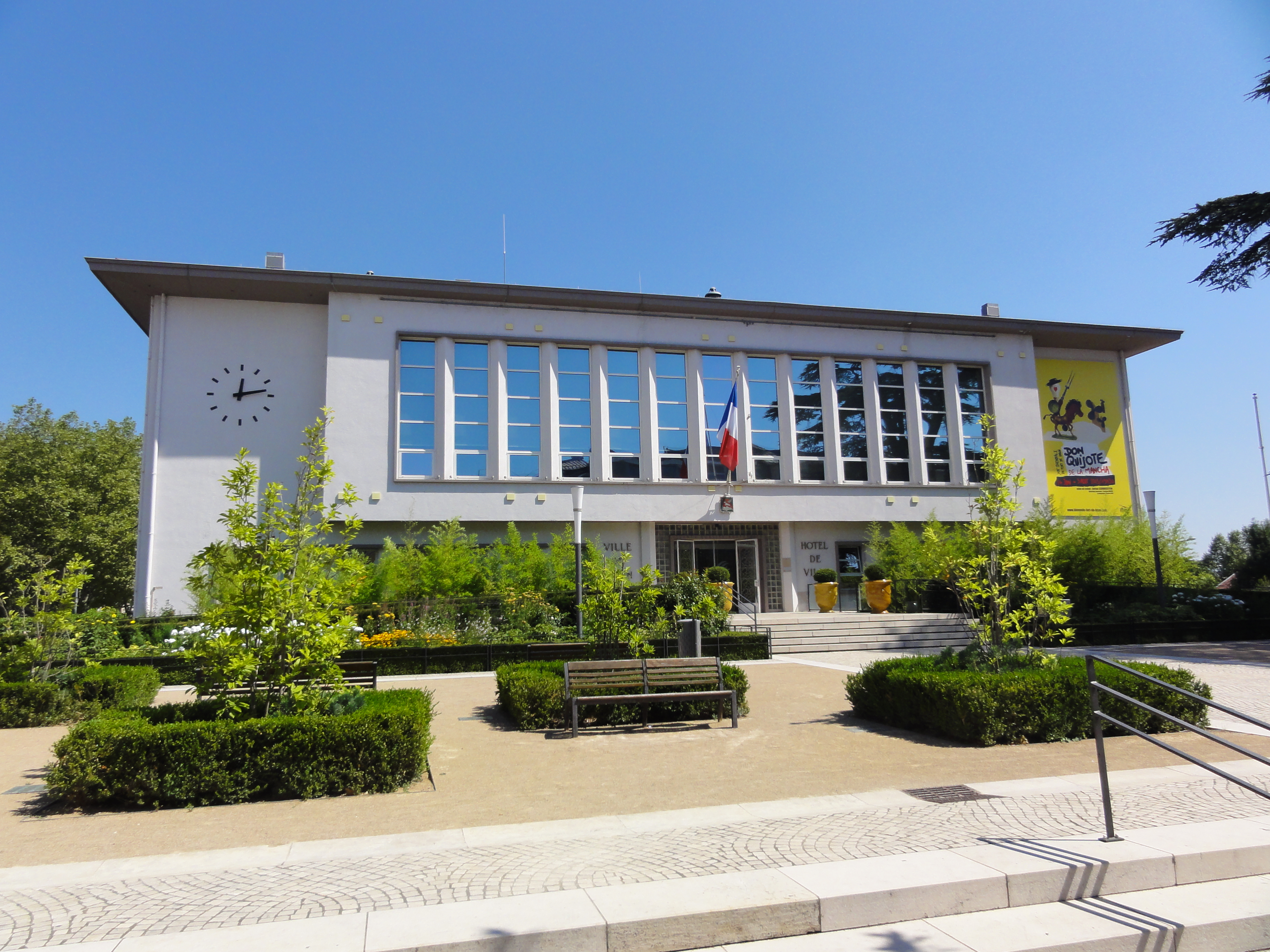
- The main frontage of the Hôtel de Ville in August 2013
- Interactive map of the Hôtel de Ville area

General information
- Type: City hall
- Architectural style: Modern style
- Location: Bron, France
- Coordinates: 45.7338°N 4.9093°E
- Completed: 1958

Design and construction
- Architect: Pierre Fonterme

The Hôtel de Ville (French pronunciation: [otɛl də vil], City Hall) is a municipal building in Bron, Metropolis of Lyon, in eastern France, standing on Place de Weingarten.

== History ==
In the 18th century, the consuls of Bron met in the Church of Saint-Denis on Place Baptiste Curial. Following the French Revolution, the new town council initially met in the church but, shortly thereafter, moved to the clergy house where they took two rooms, one of which was used for the archives, and the other accommodated the mayor.

In August 1871, following significant population growth, the council led by the mayor, Antoine Bernard, decided to commission a combined town hall and school and purchased some land, on the southwest side of what is now Avenue Franklin Roosvelt, from a local farmer, Sieur Petelaz. The new building was designed in the neoclassical style, built in stone by Joseph Frize at a cost of FFr 21,450 and was officially opened in 1876. The design involved a symmetrical main frontage of six bays facing onto what is now Avenue Franklin Roosvelt. The central section of two bays featured a square headed doorway on the left, and a window with shutters on the right. There were two more windows with shutters on the first floor, all surmounted by a pediment which contained a clock and featured a small bell tower at its apex. The other bays were also fenestrated by windows with shutters. Internally, there were two classrooms for the school on the ground floor and a municipal office on the first floor.

After the previous town hall became dilapidated, the council led by the mayor, Philippe Goy, decided to commission a dedicated town hall. The site they selected this time was at the end of an alleyway off the southwest side of Franklin-Roosevelt Avenue on what is now Place du 11-Novembre-1918. It was designed by Émile Cluzel in the neoclassical style, built in stone and was officially opened in December 1907. The design involved a symmetrical main frontage of three bays facing down the alleyway towards Avenue Franklin-Roosevelt. The central bay featured a short flight of steps leading up to a round headed doorway; there was a window with a balustraded balcony and a cornice on the first floor, and a pediment containing a clock above. The outer bays were fenestrated with segmental headed windows on the ground floor and with sash windows with cornices on the first floor.

Following the liberation of the town by the French Resistance on 3 September 1944, during the Second World War, the resistance leader, Pierre Duboeuf (known by his pseudonym "Nitain"), took control of the town hall.

After the previous town hall became too cramped, the council led by the mayor, Louis Befieux, decided to commission a modern town hall. The site they selected was on the northeast side of Avenue Franklin-Roosevelt facing the site of the 1876 town hall. The foundation stone for the new building was laid by the mayor on 20 September 1956. It was designed by Pierre Fonterme in the modern style, built in concrete and glass and was officially opened by the Minister of Information, Jacques Soustelle, on 7 December 1958. The design involved a short flight of steps leading up to a central glass doorway. On the first floor, there was a large rectangular box, which was jettied out over the pavement and fenestrated by 13 columns of glass separated by triangular strips of concrete. There was a clock, in the recessed space on the left of the box, and a blind wall, in the recessed space on the right of the box. Internally, the principal room was the Salle du Conseil (council chamber).

A ceremony was held in the town hall on 4 May 1963 to inaugurate the twinning of Bron with the town of Weingarten in Germany. The mayor of Weingarten, Richard Mayer, travelled to Bron for the ceremony.
