= Jacques Trolley de Prévaux =

French Navy officer and member of the Resistance (1888-1944)

- Born: 2 April 1888
- Died: 19 August 1944 (aged 56) Bron, France
- Allegiance: French Third Republic (1906-1940); Vichy France (1940-1941); Free France (1942-1944)
- Branch: French Navy; French Naval Aviation; French Resistance
- Rank: contre-amiral
- Conflicts: First World War; Second World War
- Awards: Commander of the Legion of Honour; Croix de guerre 1939–1945; Croix de guerre 1914–1918; Companions of Liberation; Distinguished Service Order; Virtuti Militari
- Education: École Navale

Jacques Marie Charles Trolley de Prévaux (2 April 1888 — 19 August 1944) was a French Navy officer and member of the Resistance. After a brilliant career in the Navy as a pioneer of the Aéronavale and having risen to the rank of captain, he fell out of favour with the Vichy Regime for his sympathies with the Resistance. He became a leader of an intelligence network focused on the Mediterranean, and was eventually betrayed and assassinated by the Nazis, along with his wife, Lotka Leitner. Both were posthumously and jointly made Compagnons in the Ordre de la Libération.

== Biography ==
=== Youth and studies ===
Jacques Trolley de Prévaux was born to an old family of nobility of the Robe, and with a modest fortune. The family was from Normandy and had been knighted by Henri III in 1586. Apart from a remote connection to Jean d'Arc, the elder brother of Joan of Arc, there was no military tradition in the family. Jacques' father, Alfred Trolley de Prévaux, was a professor of commercial law at the Institut catholique de Lille. Jacques' mother died in 1899, when he was 11.

Trolley de Prévaux studied at École Saint-Joseph de Lille, where he proved to be a keen reader. Choosing a naval career, he entered the École Navale in 1906, ranking third out of 48 in the competitive entrance examination. He graduated 5th out of 48 in the class of 1908. He then performed the customary practical training year with a circumnavigation aboard Duguay-Trouin from 1908 to 1909.

Trolley de Prévaux was first appointed as an Ensign to the battleship Charlemagne in Toulon in 1910. There, he acquired a taste for opium, which was a common pastime in the Navy at the time, Toulon harbouring several establishments specialised in that trade. From 1912 to 1913, he served on the cruiser Descartes, sailing the Atlantic Ocean and the Caribbean. In April 1914, he was appointed to the flotilla Division of the 1st naval Army as second officer on the heavy torpedo boat Fanfare.

=== First World War ===
Trolley de Prévaux took part in World War I, mostly in the Mediterranean. In August 1914, he served as gunnery and maneuver officer on the torpedo boat Chasseur; in May 1916, he transferred on Paris as aid to the chief of the naval fusiliers. In June 1916, he was appointed second officer on the gunboat Diligente.

In Juin 1917, Trolley de Prévaux was granted a transfer to the French Naval Aviation, which he had been pursuing since 1915. He trained on airships at Saint-Cyr before graduating and being promoted to Lieutenant. He then took his first command as head of the airbase of Marquise-Rinxent in Pas-de-Calais, near Boulogne-sur-Mer, from October 1917 to November 1919. He was responsible for around 100 men. As airships emerged as a powerful weapon against shipping, and as the French naval aviation was growing (reaching 700 places, 460 pilots, and around 20 airships in late 1917) Prévaux clocked many flight hours, earning the Legion of Honour, the Croix de guerre, and a brigade-level mention in dispatches. After the Armistice, he flew over the front lines from Nieuport to Verdun with a cameraman, filming the war-torn landscape; the film was subsequently lost, and found again in the late 1990s.

=== Interwar period ===
From November 1919, Trolley de Prévaux was given command of the Airship base at Montebourg in Manche.

In February 1920, he was appointed to the Naval Ministry as staff officer to Minister Adolphe Landry, and later to Minister Gabriel Guist'hau.

On 12 April 1920, Prévaux married Blandine Ollivier in the 8th arrondissement of Paris. Ollivier was of high bourgeois extraction and granddaughter of Académicien and Deputy Émile Ollivier, who had served as Minister and Chief of Government under Napoléon III between 1869 and 1870, and of Blandine Liszt. The couple would sire two children.

In January 1922, Prévaux was appointed to command a minesweeper flotilla in Toulon, with his flag on the gunboat Diligente. In July 1923, he was promoted to lieutenant-commander.

On 1 June 1924, he was given command of Cuers-Pierrefeu airbase in Var, which put him in charge of large zeppelin Méditerranée (ex-Nordstern, transferred from Germany to France as war reparation, and sister-ship to the ill-fated Dixmude). Cuers also harboured a Goliath wing that took part in the Rif War.

From 1926 to 1930, Prévaux served as naval attaché in Berlin, earning a promotion to commander in 1928. From May 1931 to July 1933, he captained the aviso Altaïr, stationed off the Shanghai French Concession. From 1934 to 1935, he headed Rochefort airbase. He then moved to Toulon to train at the Centre des hautes études navales and at the Institut des hautes études de défense nationale, until July 1937.

Around that time, he met Lotka Leitner, a young woman of Jewish and Polish heritage, French by naturalisation.

Promoted to Captain in August 1937, Prévaux was given command of the light cruiser Duguay-Trouin, in Toulon. In 1939, Duguay-Trouin deployed to protect shipping between the metropolitan France and the French West Africa, before transferring to the naval division of Levant.

=== Second World War ===
After the outbreak of the Second World War, at the time of the Armistice of 22 June 1940, Duguay-Trouin was in Alexandria with the rest of the Force X, under Admiral Godfroy. On 2 July 1940, the British launched Operation Catapult; Godfroy and British Admiral Cunningham reached an agreement to disarm the Force X without shedding blood. In contrast to a few officers, such as d'Estienne d'Orves, whom this incident drove to join Free France, Prévaux remained loyal to the Government and then to then Vichy Regime. In November 1940, Prévaux fell gravely ill and was repatriated to Toulon.

In July 1941, he was appointed President of the naval tribunal of Toulon. At this time, he established contacts with the Résistance when he came in relations with the Franco-Polish intelligence network "F2". In December 1941, his sympathies for De Gaulle and for the Résistance led Admiral Darlan to dismiss him.

From early 1942, Prévaux served as an informer to F2 under the nom de guerre of "Vox", along with his wife Lotka Leitner as "Kalo", providing intelligence about the German Navy. In November 1942, when the Nazis invaded the so-called Zone Libre, F2 disbanded to avoid arrests; Prévaux was subsequently instrumental in reconstituting the network. British authorities bestowed him the Distinguished Service Order in 1943. He rose to head the network "Anne", which constituted the Mediterranean branch of F2, covering Marseille, Toulon, and Nice. In the course of the following year, this network provided intelligence about German naval and air units, as well as about coastal fortifications, which proved of interest for Operation Dragoon.

On 29 March 1944, the Gestapo arrested Leitner and Prévaux. They were brought to Baumettes and later to Montluc Prison in Lyon, where Prévaux was tortured. He refused to talk, taking the whole of the network activities as his personal responsibility.

On 19 August 1944, they were killed by firing squad in Bron, during one of the last executions perpetrated by the Nazis before they fled Lyon.

Jacques de Prévaux was buried in Villeurbanne at the National necropolis of Doua.

== Military career ==
- 1911 : Ensign (5 October)
- 1917 : Lieutenant (2 August)
- 1923 : Lieutenant-commander (25 July)
- 1928 : Commander (17 January)
- 1937 : Captain (1 August)
- 1945 : Rear-Admiral (16 April), with retroactive effect to 1 January 1941 and annulation of the dismissal decided by Darlan. This is not a posthumous promotion, Prévaux having been considered Missing in Action since the day of his arrest, and the proofs of his assassination having emerged only in November 1945.

== Honours ==
=== French honours ===
- Légion d'honneur : Knight (16 June 1920); Officer (21 January 1931); Commandeur (10 April 1945).
- Croix de la Libération, posthumously and jointly with Lotka Leitner (Note: The mention states: "United in action for the Resistance, united in the burden of prison, they found each other united again in sacrifice. We shall therefore not separate them under the symbol of the Cross of Lorraine and the motto of our Order" (Unis dans l'action de résistance, unis dans l'épreuve des prisons, ils se trouvèrent encore unis dans le sacrifice. Nous ne les séparerons donc pas sous le signe de la Croix de Lorraine et la devise de notre Ordre)) (Decree of 18 January 1946)
- Croix de guerre 1914–1918 (14 November 1918)
- Croix de guerre 1939–1945 (10 April 1945)
- Médaille interalliée 1914–1918
- Médaille commémorative de la guerre 1914–1918

=== Foreign honours ===
- Distinguished Service Order (UK, 31 January 1943)
- Virtuti Militari (Poland, 19 April 1945)

=== Legacy ===
- A street in Paris, in the 13th Arrondissement is named after Prévaux.
- An avenue of Toulon is named after Prévaux.
- A commemorative plaque was affixed at Colline Saint-Pierre in Toulon.
- A military building in Lyon and two amphitheatres in Toulon and Rochefort are named after Prévaux and Leitner.
- Prévaux and Leitner are mentioned on the monument at Montluc in Bron.
- Jacques de Prévaux is mentioned on the monument at Lavandou.

== Aude de Prévaux ==
Aude de Prévaux, born to Prévaux and Leitner in June 1943, was taken by the family of General François Trolley de Prévaux after their assassination. François a brother of Jacques remained faithful to the Vichy Regime, kept Aude in ignorance of her birth parents until she was 23.

Aude de Prévaux wrote a book about her parents, Un Amour dans la tempête de l'histoire – Jacques et Lotka de Prévaux (Kiron – Éditions du Félin, 1999), which won the Maréchal Foch Prize of the Académie française (Bronze Medal) and the Prix Saint-Simon in 1999. She was the subject of the France 2 broadcast Prise directe, "Children of villains, children of heroes", by Béatrice Schönberg.

== Notes and references ==
=== Bibliography ===
- Aude Yung-de Prévaux (2004) [1998]. Un Amour dans la tempête de l'histoire – Jacques et Lotka de Prévaux. Résistance – Liberté – Mémoire. Paris: Kiron – Éditions du Félin. p. 222. ISBN 2-86645-550-9. [recension par Laurent Douzou], Prix du maréchal Foch de l'Académie française en 1999 – Prix Saint-Simon 1999.
  - (in English) Traduit en anglais : Aude Yung-de Prévaux, Love in the Tempest of History – A French Resistance Story, éd. Free Press, 2001, 224 p. ISBN 0-7432-0194-9, 978-0743201940 [présentation en ligne]; autres éditions : Jacques and Lotka – A Resistance Story, éd. Bloomsbury Publishing PLC, 2000, 224 p. ISBN 0-7475-4793-9, 978-0747547938 et 2001 ISBN 0-7475-5305-X, 978-0747553052.
  - (in German) Traduit en allemand : Aude Yung-de Prévaux, Jacques und Lotka – Ein Liebe in den Zeiten der Resistance, éd. Kiepenheuer & Witsch, 2001 ISBN 3-462-02978-9, 978-3462029789
- François Pédron (28 August 2014). "Jacques et Lotka de Prévaux – Les amoureux de la Résistance". parismatch.com. Paris Match..
