= Fort de Bron =

- Lyon in France
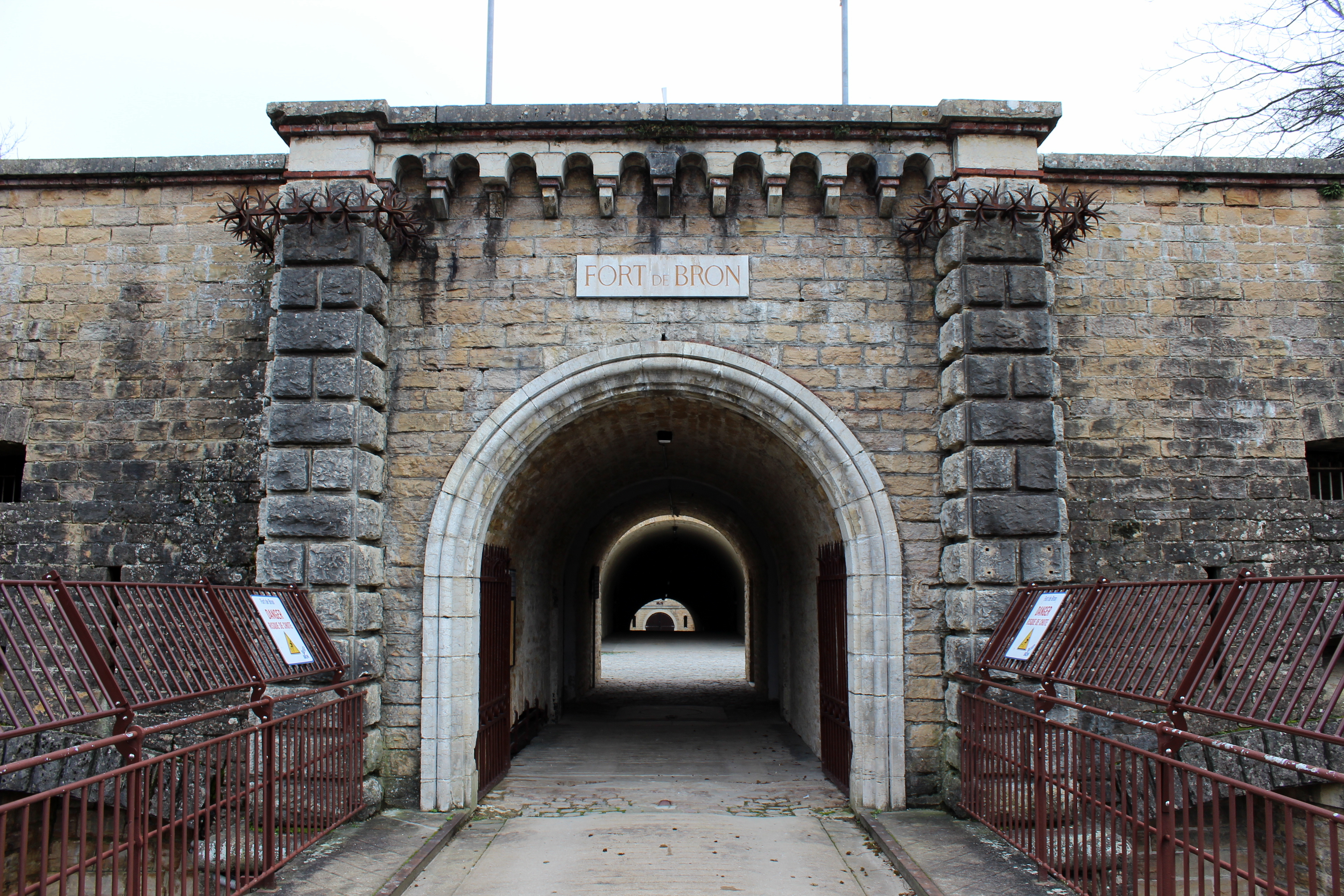
- Entrance of fort de Bron.

Site information
- Type: Fort

Location
- Coordinates: 45.732187°N 4.921567°E

Site history
- Built: 1875–1877

The Fort de Bron is a fortification built between 1875 and 1877, located in the commune of Bron. It is part of the second belt of fortifications around Lyon, which also includes Fort de Vancia, Fort de Feyzin and Fort du Mont Verdun.

== History ==
Its history is linked to the Franco-Prussian War of 1870. Indeed, as a result of the Treaty of Frankfurt which ended the 1870 war, France lost Alsace and Lorraine, reducing its borders. To ensure the defence of Lyon, it built a strong cordon of forts encircling the city to the east, which included the forts of Bron, Vancia, Feyzin and Mont Verdun. These forts were equipped with significant amounts of artillery with all the hardware, staff, and powder storage that this then entailed.

When a defensive reorganization occurred in France in 1874, the commune of Bron was therefore included in the crown of detached forts, to protect the stronghold of Lyon.

From 1875 to 1885, the following were built successively around the town:

- Fort de Bron, placed on the heights above the Rhone valley, covering as far as Saint-Priest;
- Batteries at Lessivas and Parilly;
- A walled enclosure with four bastions.

The Fort de Bron is the only one remaining.

Fort de Bron was completed with two annexed batteries at Lessivas and Parilly. But advances in artillery quickly made these forts, and therefore that of Bron, ineffective, inadequate and unable to defend Lyon. During World War I, which did not see fighting in this region, the fort was used only as a barracks and equipment warehouse. During the Second World War the Germans used it as a prison. The French army used it until 1962 as an annex of the air base; it was decommissioned in 1963.

== Characteristics ==
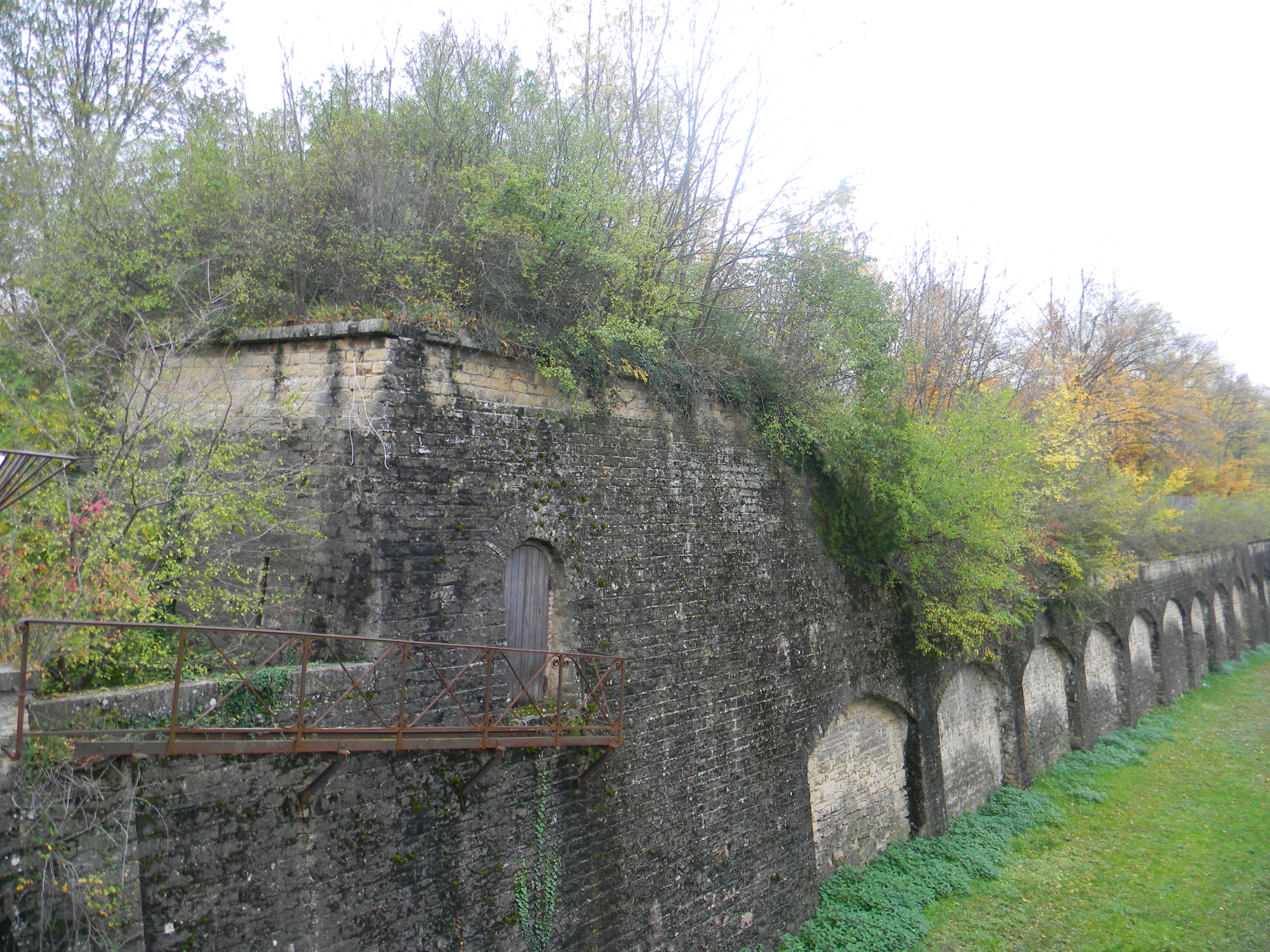
Ravelin protecting the entrance.

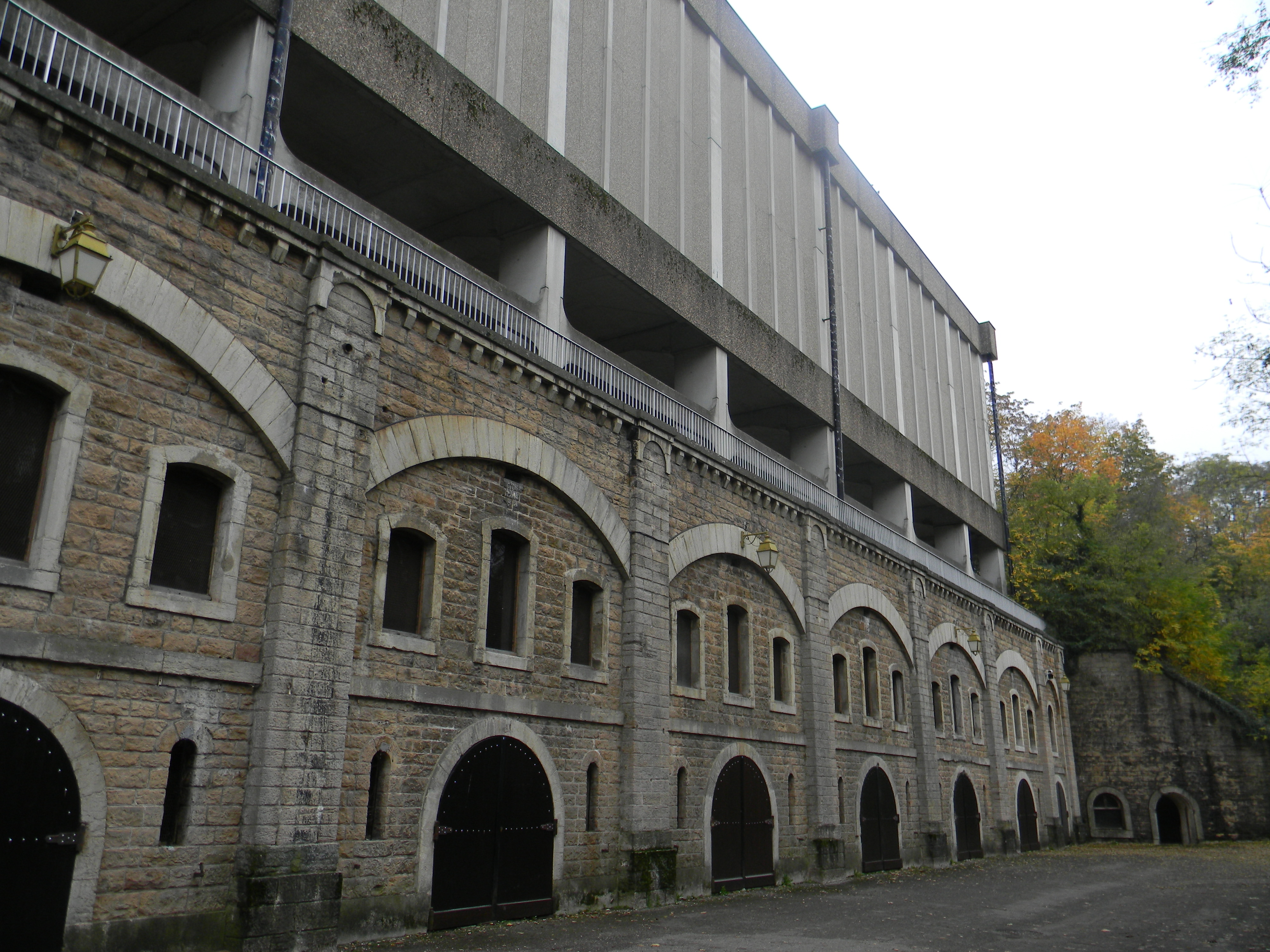
Barracks. The building is above a water tank constructed later.

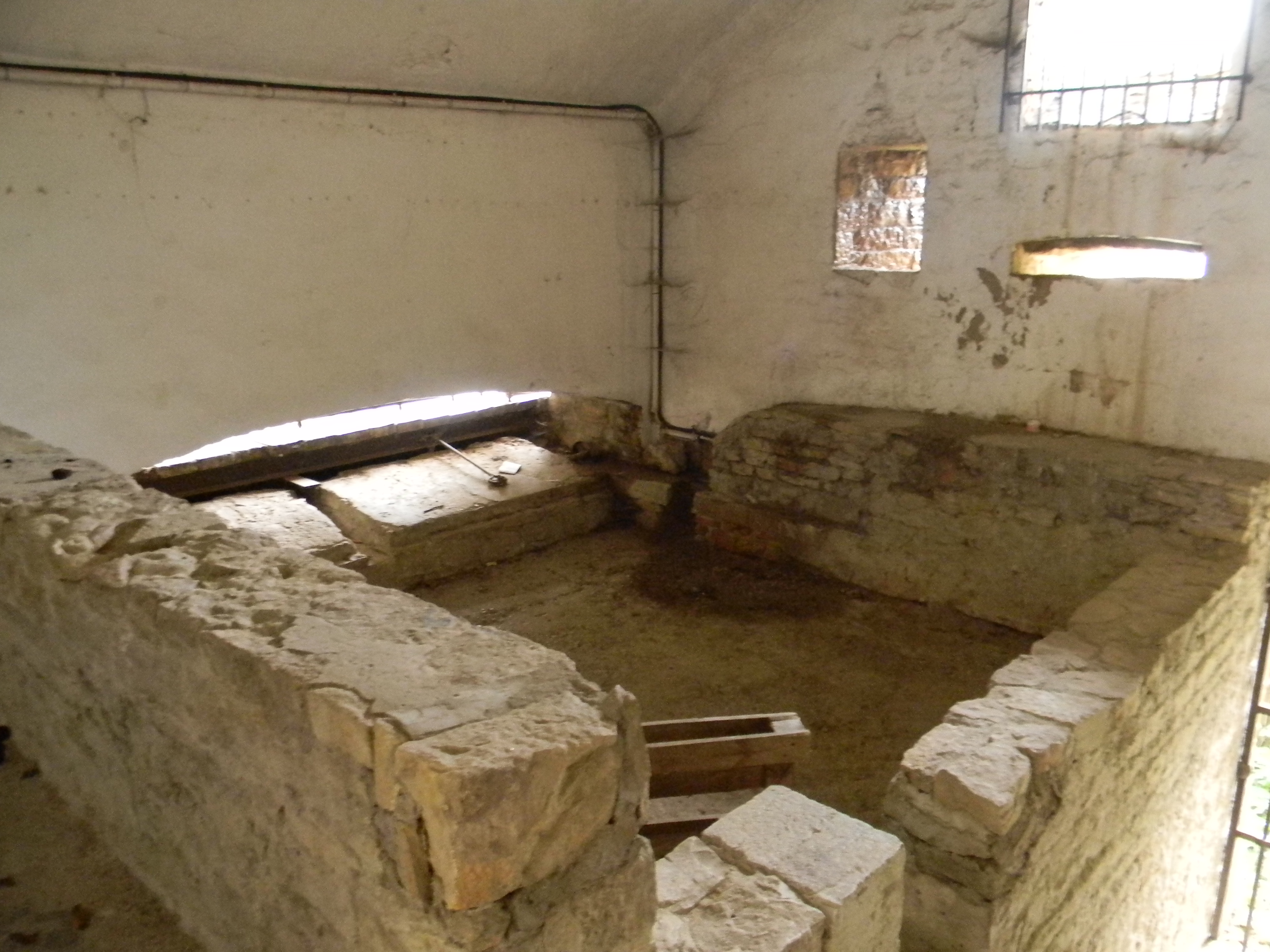
Room housing the drawbridge when retracted.

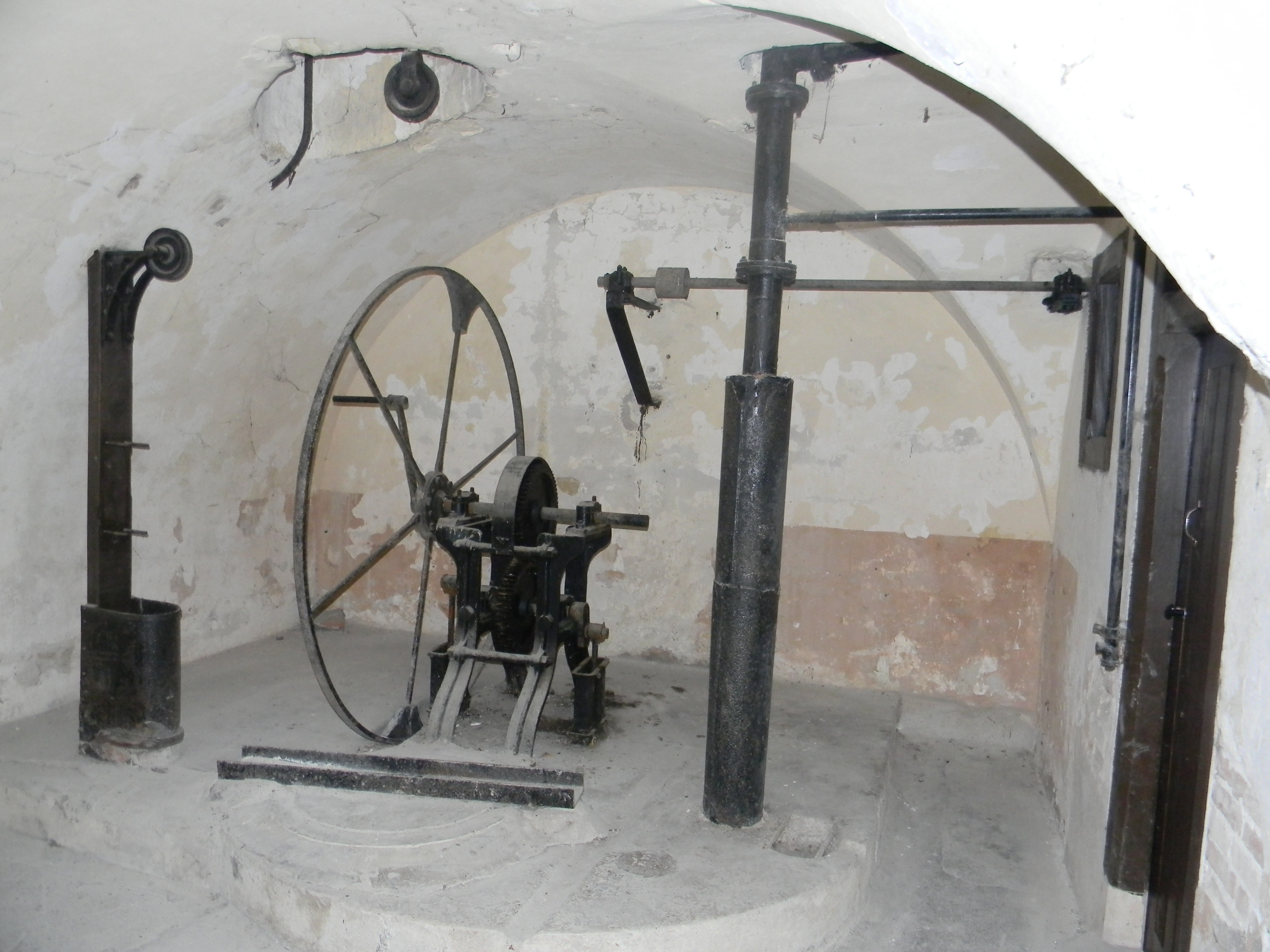
Water pump.

=== Role ===
The establishment of this fort allowed the City of Lyon to protect itself from enemy attacks from the east, dominating the surrounding plain, the fort covered Décines, Chassieu and Saint-Priest.

=== Location ===
The fort is located at shooting distance by antique cannon from Lyon (i.e. 7 to 8 km), at 212 metres above sea level on a hill at Bron.

=== Composition ===
This polygonal structure is surrounded by a deep moat six to eight metres deep and twelve to fourteen metres wide, defended by caponiers. The buildings (some underground) of the 1,500 m^{2} site could accommodate 841 men in war. The bridge that allows access to the rear entrance of the fort is unique: it retracts sideways, sliding on steel rollers.

=== Land and zones ===
A judgement of expropriation dating from 10 June 1874 released 24 hectares for the construction of the fort. Like other forts, military land was bounded by stone posts located around it, their hats on an engraving showing the direction of the next point.

=== Armament ===
The fort, whose cannons can reach targets located 6 km away (with an extended range up to 8 km, in 1880, with the new Bange guns), was equipped with:

- 17 guns on the cavalier,
- 13 guns on the lower enclosure,
- 10 light guns to defend the moats,
- 5 mortars,
  - a total of 45 pieces of artillery.

=== Garrison and housing ===
841 people were housed in wartime:

- 1 commander of the fort,
- 17 officers,
- 39 NCOs,
- 784 soldiers.

Ten horses were also present on the site.

Officers and NCOs were housed in the second floor barracks, upstairs. The rest of the men occupied the first floor of the barracks at a rate of 56 soldiers to a room.

The fort was also equipped with two kitchens, a bakery, a well, a cistern, latrines, a forge and shops.

- The bakery required 69,400 kg flour in reserve.
- A pump drew drinking water from a depth of 37 metres in the water table at a rate of 50 m³ per day, also feeding a tank containing 13 m³. This was intended to provide water in the event of pump failure during three days.
- Lighting was by kerosene lamps, candles and skylights.

Disciplinary premises were also placed in the centre of the fort, including a guard room and four cells.

== Construction ==
The order was given on 8 May 1874 by General Cissey of the Ministry of War, to begin construction of the Fort of Bron. The stone came from Trept and from the Monts d'Or, a small mountain range to the northwest of Lyon. Construction began in 1875 and continued until 1877 for a total cost of 3,014,578 francs:

- 760,000 francs in 1875,
- 1,230,000 francs in 1876,
- 745,000 francs in 1877,
- 19,000 francs in 1878, and
- 260,578 francs for acquisition costs.

== Today ==
The greater Lyon council bought the fort in 1975 to build two water tanks, occupying 50% of the built area of the fort and 300 metres of a South divide as a spillway for security. On 23 September 1976 at the Extra-Municipal Planning Commission (CEMU), the COURLY proposed to transform the ditches to public landfill, to abandon the rubble, and to finally abort the project. The army still retained 6 hectares of woodland (including some of ditches and the Diamond gap) in order to build an extension of the Army medical school. Several attempts to negotiate with the army to retain all the fort intact failed, so an agreement was signed between the mayor of Bron, André Sousi, and the Prime Minister, Raymond Barre, proposing the purchase of the land totalling 9,878 m^{2}) by the municipality at the price of 10 francs per m², i.e. 98,780 francs.

The purchase allowed the creation in 1983 of a fitness trail around the fort.

The Fort de Bron hosts a theatrical event every two years: the Biennial du Fort de Bron; for two months, a theatre company takes possession of the premises. In 2009, The Odyssey of Homer drew nearly 17,000 spectators 15,000 in 2011.

The Fort de Bron is managed by an association created March 25, 1982, which organises free tours on the first Sunday of each month. The association also participates in Heritage Days and organizes a craft exhibition in early October. A museum has also been built there.

The museum Société Lyonnaise History of Aviation and Aerospace Documentation is installed in three rooms of the barracks on the second floor.

The fort has also been used as a filming location for video clips, movie scenes or interviews. The TV movie The gate of heaven by Denys Granier-Deferre, broadcast 1993, and Under guard, the TV movie Luc Beraud, broadcast in 2002, and the short films Masquerade from Nicolas Brossette, broadcast 2007, and The décarquilleurs from Jean-Paul Lebesson were partly shot at the fort.

== See also ==
- Ceintures de Lyon

== Bibliography ==
- Dallemagne, François (2006), Éditions Lyonnaises d'Art et d'Histoire (ed.), Les défenses de Lyon: enceintes et fortifications (in French), Georges Fessy(photographer), Lyon, pp. 185–193, ISBN 2-84147-177-2
- Brunet, François; Vincent, Mathilde; Chavanne, André (April 2002), Association du fort de Bron (ed.), Le fort de Bron: Ah! quelle histoire! (in French), Bron, p. 17
- Chavanne, André; Pallas, Raphaël; Vincent, Serge; Lebel, Pierre; Annie Guillemot (2013), Association du Fort de Bron (ed.), Fort de Bron: les pierres témoigneront (in French), Bron, p. 35
