= Bron =

- Commune
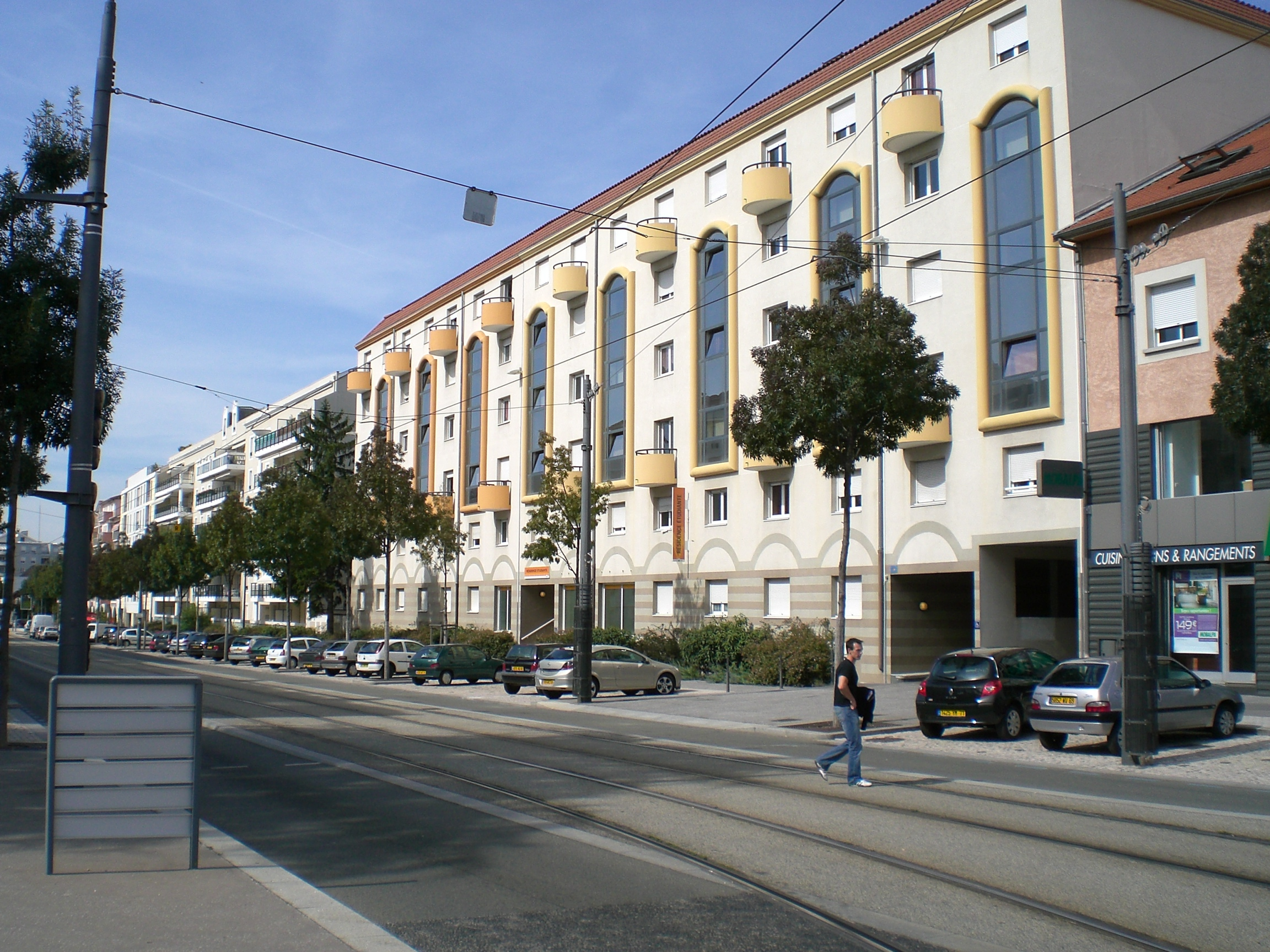
- Buildings on the Avenue Franklin Roosevelt

- Coat of arms
- Location of Bron
- Location within France Location within Auvergne-Rhône-Alpes
- Coordinates: 45°44′22″N 4°54′50″E
- Country: France
- Region: Auvergne-Rhône-Alpes
- Metropolis: Lyon Metropolis
- Arrondissement: Lyon

Government
  - Mayor (2020–2026): Jérémie Breaud
- Area^{1}: 10.3 km^{2} (4.0 sq mi)
- Elevation: 212 m (696 ft)
- Highest elevation: 221 m (725 ft)
- Lowest elevation: 183 m (600 ft)
- Population (2023): 42,982
  - Density: 4,170/km^{2} (10,800/sq mi)
- Time zone: UTC+01:00 (CET)
  - Summer (DST): UTC+02:00 (CEST)
- INSEE/Postal code: 69029 /69500
- ^{1} French Land Register data, which excludes lakes, ponds, glaciers > 1 km^{2} (0.386 sq mi or 247 acres) and river estuaries.

Bron (French pronunciation: [bʁɔ̃]) is a commune in the Metropolis of Lyon, Auvergne-Rhône-Alpes region, eastern France.

== Geography ==
Bron lies 10 km (6.2 mi) east-southeast of central Lyon. It is the sixth-largest suburb of the city of Lyon, and is adjacent to its east side.

=== Climate ===
Climate data for Lyon-Bron (Lyon–Bron Airport), elevation: 201 m, 1981–2010 normals, extremes 1920–present
Month	Jan	Feb	Mar	Apr	May	Jun	Jul	Aug	Sep	Oct	Nov	Dec	Year
Record high °C (°F)	19.1 (66.4)	21.9 (71.4)	25.7 (78.3)	30.1 (86.2)	34.2 (93.6)	38.4 (101.1)	39.8 (103.6)	40.5 (104.9)	35.8 (96.4)	28.4 (83.1)	23.0 (73.4)	20.2 (68.4)	40.5 (104.9)
Mean daily maximum °C (°F)	6.4 (43.5)	8.4 (47.1)	13.0 (55.4)	16.3 (61.3)	20.8 (69.4)	24.6 (76.3)	27.7 (81.9)	27.2 (81.0)	22.7 (72.9)	17.4 (63.3)	10.8 (51.4)	7.1 (44.8)	16.9 (62.4)
Daily mean °C (°F)	3.4 (38.1)	4.8 (40.6)	8.4 (47.1)	11.4 (52.5)	15.8 (60.4)	19.4 (66.9)	22.1 (71.8)	21.6 (70.9)	17.6 (63.7)	13.4 (56.1)	7.5 (45.5)	4.3 (39.7)	12.5 (54.5)
Mean daily minimum °C (°F)	0.3 (32.5)	1.1 (34.0)	3.8 (38.8)	6.5 (43.7)	10.7 (51.3)	14.1 (57.4)	16.6 (61.9)	16.0 (60.8)	12.5 (54.5)	9.3 (48.7)	4.3 (39.7)	1.6 (34.9)	8.1 (46.6)
Record low °C (°F)	−23.0 (−9.4)	−22.5 (−8.5)	−10.5 (13.1)	−4.4 (24.1)	−3.8 (25.2)	2.3 (36.1)	6.1 (43.0)	4.6 (40.3)	0.2 (32.4)	−4.5 (23.9)	−9.4 (15.1)	−24.6 (−12.3)	−24.6 (−12.3)
Average precipitation mm (inches)	47.2 (1.86)	44.1 (1.74)	50.4 (1.98)	74.9 (2.95)	90.8 (3.57)	75.6 (2.98)	63.7 (2.51)	62.0 (2.44)	87.5 (3.44)	98.6 (3.88)	81.9 (3.22)	55.2 (2.17)	831.9 (32.75)
Average precipitation days (≥ 1.0 mm)	9.0	7.8	8.4	9.3	11.3	8.4	6.9	7.1	7.6	10.2	9.0	9.1	104.1
Mean monthly sunshine hours	73.9	101.2	170.2	190.5	221.4	254.3	283.0	252.7	194.8	129.6	75.9	54.5	2,001.9
Source: Météo France

Climate data for Lyon-Bron (Lyon–Bron Airport), elevation: 201 m, 1961–1990 normals and extremes
Month	Jan	Feb	Mar	Apr	May	Jun	Jul	Aug	Sep	Oct	Nov	Dec	Year
Record high °C (°F)	16.3 (61.3)	21.4 (70.5)	25.7 (78.3)	28.0 (82.4)	29.4 (84.9)	34.4 (93.9)	39.8 (103.6)	37.1 (98.8)	33.8 (92.8)	28.4 (83.1)	22.6 (72.7)	20.2 (68.4)	39.8 (103.6)
Mean maximum °C (°F)	10.2 (50.4)	14.4 (57.9)	15.9 (60.6)	18.6 (65.5)	23.1 (73.6)	28.8 (83.8)	32.8 (91.0)	28.1 (82.6)	27.3 (81.1)	19.7 (67.5)	14.1 (57.4)	9.5 (49.1)	32.8 (91.0)
Mean daily maximum °C (°F)	6.1 (43.0)	8.2 (46.8)	11.6 (52.9)	15.2 (59.4)	19.1 (66.4)	22.9 (73.2)	26.1 (79.0)	26.0 (78.8)	22.4 (72.3)	17.1 (62.8)	10.0 (50.0)	6.4 (43.5)	15.9 (60.7)
Daily mean °C (°F)	3.0 (37.4)	4.9 (40.8)	7.4 (45.3)	10.2 (50.4)	14.0 (57.2)	17.6 (63.7)	20.6 (69.1)	20.0 (68.0)	17.1 (62.8)	12.7 (54.9)	6.7 (44.1)	3.9 (39.0)	11.5 (52.7)
Mean daily minimum °C (°F)	0.2 (32.4)	1.4 (34.5)	2.9 (37.2)	5.2 (41.4)	9.1 (48.4)	12.5 (54.5)	14.8 (58.6)	14.4 (57.9)	11.7 (53.1)	8.3 (46.9)	3.5 (38.3)	0.7 (33.3)	7.1 (44.7)
Mean minimum °C (°F)	−7.0 (19.4)	−4.7 (23.5)	−1.4 (29.5)	3.2 (37.8)	7.6 (45.7)	10.9 (51.6)	13.1 (55.6)	12.9 (55.2)	8.1 (46.6)	4.5 (40.1)	1.0 (33.8)	−4.7 (23.5)	−7.0 (19.4)
Record low °C (°F)	−23.0 (−9.4)	−19.3 (−2.7)	−10.5 (13.1)	−3.2 (26.2)	−0.3 (31.5)	3.6 (38.5)	6.1 (43.0)	5.2 (41.4)	1.9 (35.4)	−3.2 (26.2)	−7.1 (19.2)	−16.0 (3.2)	−23.0 (−9.4)
Average precipitation mm (inches)	54.0 (2.13)	53.8 (2.12)	72.2 (2.84)	56.1 (2.21)	72.6 (2.86)	73.2 (2.88)	54.5 (2.15)	71.6 (2.82)	53.2 (2.09)	56.2 (2.21)	68.0 (2.68)	55.8 (2.20)	741.2 (29.19)
Average precipitation days (≥ 1.0 mm)	10.4	9.3	9.7	9.6	10.9	8.2	6.8	8.2	7.3	8.5	8.9	9.8	107.6
Average snowy days	4.5	2.0	2.0	1.0	0.0	0.0	0.0	0.0	0.0	0.0	1.0	4.0	14.5
Average relative humidity (%)	84	80	74	71	72	70	65	70	76	82	84	86	76
Mean monthly sunshine hours	62.6	89.8	147.5	184.2	215.9	250.9	292.6	259.0	208.1	134.3	75.3	55.4	1,975.6
Percentage possible sunshine	23	31	41	46	47	54	62	60	56	40	27	21	42
Source 1: NOAA
Source 2: Infoclimat.fr (humidity)

== History ==
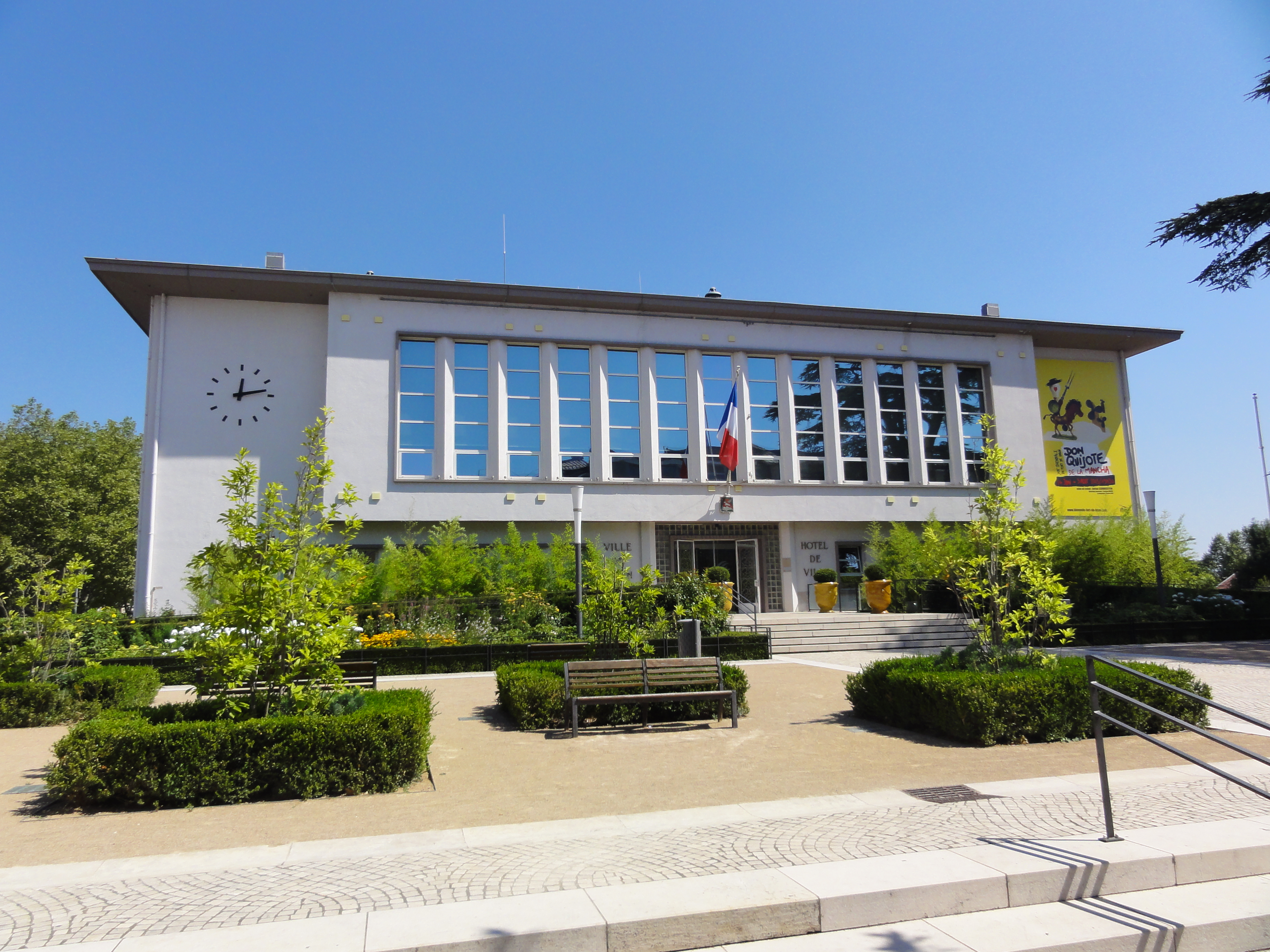
The Hôtel de Ville

The earliest traces of life in Bron can be found in the cemetery and date from 71 BC. The town as it is today did not take shape until approximately 1812.

In mid-August 1944, prisoners from Montluc prison were taken to Bron Airfield where 109 of them, including 72 Jews, were killed in the Bron massacres, which would become known as Le Charnier de Bron ("The Charnel house of Bron").

The Hôtel de Ville was completed in 1958.

Bron was spared much of the damage caused by the riots in many of France's suburbs in the 1990s, such as in Vénissieux and Villeurbanne.

== Administration ==
The municipal council is composed of 43 members elected for a six-year term. The mayor are elected by the councilors.

== Sights ==
The Fort de Bron, erected between 1872 and 1876, is part of the second belt of fortifications around Lyon.

== Population ==
Historical population

Year	Pop.	±% p.a.
1793	441	—
1800	446	+0.16%
1806	448	+0.07%
1821	694	+2.96%
1831	798	+1.41%
1836	850	+1.27%
1841	929	+1.79%
1846	999	+1.46%
1851	981	−0.36%
1856	981	+0.00%
1861	1,010	+0.58%
1866	1,041	+0.61%
1872	1,015	−0.42%
1876	2,168	+20.89%
1881	2,470	+2.64%
1886	2,712	+1.89%
1891	2,691	−0.16%
1896	2,665	−0.19%
1901	3,206	+3.77%

Year	Pop.	±% p.a.
1906	3,506	+1.81%
1911	4,160	+3.48%
1921	6,397	+4.40%
1926	8,774	+6.52%
1931	12,423	+7.20%
1936	13,161	+1.16%
1946	12,597	−0.44%
1954	14,195	+1.50%
1962	26,959	+8.35%
1968	41,619	+7.51%
1975	44,563	+0.98%
1982	40,638	−1.31%
1990	39,683	−0.30%
1999	37,369	−0.67%
2007	38,833	+0.48%
2012	39,232	+0.20%
2017	41,543	+1.15%
2023	42,982	+0.57%

Source: EHESS and INSEE (1968–2023)

== Transport ==
Bron is served by the following TCL (Lyon public transport) services:

- Metro
  - Line D (Gare de Vaise to Gare de Vénissieux) – served by 2 stations (Mermoz-Pinel and Parilly) located on the boundary with Lyon.
- Tram
  - Line T2 (Perrache to Saint-Priest Bel-Air) – served by 8 stations.
  - Line T5 (Grange-Blanche to Parc du Chêne, continuing to Eurexpo on exhibition days) – served by 7 stations.
- Bus
  - C8 (Grange Blanche – Vaulx-en-Velin Résistance)
  - C9 (Bellecour Antoine Poncet – Hôpitaux Est)
  - C15 (Laurent Bonnevay – Bachut Mairie du 8e)
  - C17 (Charpennes – Porte des Alpes)
  - 24 (Bachut – Bron – Sept Chemins)
  - 25 (Cordeliers – Gare Part-Dieu – Montchat – Sept Chemins)
  - 26 (Bachut – Bron Aéroport – Manissieux)
  - 52 (Parilly Université Hippodrome – Vaulx-En-Velin La Grappinière)
  - 64 (Laurent Bonnevay – La Soie – Bron Droits de l'Homme)
  - 68 (Vaulx-en-Velin La Soie – Chassieu – Azieu)
  - 78 (Mermoz-Pinel – Parc du Chêne – Sept Chemins)
  - 79 (Grange Blanche – Bron – Décines or Chassieu)
  - 81 (Laurent Bonnevay – Bron – Porte des Alpes)
  - 82 (Vaulx-en-Velin La Soie – Bron – La Borelle)
  - 93 (Hôpital Feyzin Vénissieux – Porte des Alpes / Parc Technologique)
  - Zi7 (Vaulx-En-Velin La Soie – Bron Droits De L'Homme)

Bron Airport
Lyon-Bron Airport (technically located in the communes of Chassieu and Saint-Priest) has existed since 1920, although much of its commercial activity was diverted to Satolas (Saint-Exupéry International Airport), Lyon's main airport, in 1975.

== Education ==
Bron is home to part of the University of Lyon 2. The Bron campus is located on the south-eastern edge of the town, close to the Parc de Parilly and Saint-Priest.

== Notable residents ==
- Roséva Bidois (born 2000), French heptathlete
- Arthur Rozenfeld (born 1995), basketball player in the Israeli Basketball Premier League
- Karim Benzema, football player for Al-Ittihad

== Twin towns ==
Bron is twinned with:

- Cumbernauld, Scotland, United Kingdom
- Grimma, Germany
- Weingarten, Germany
- Talavera de la Reina, Spain

== See also ==
- Communes of the Rhône department
