= Witold Langenfeld =

Polish military officer and intelligence operative (1896–1968)

- Major Witold Langenfeld in the uniform of a communications officer
- Born: Witold Karol Langenfeld; 9 April 1896; Lemberg, Kingdom of Galicia and Lodomeria, Austria-Hungary
- Died: 30 December 1968 (aged 72); Yonkers, New York, U.S.
- Burial place: Gate of Heaven Cemetery, Hawthorne, New York
- Military career
- Allegiance: Poland; Austria-Hungary (1917–1918)
- Branch: Polish Army; Polish Armed Forces in the West
- Service years: 1917–1946
- Rank: Lieutenant colonel of communications
- Units: 2nd Communications Regiment; Station No. 3 in Bydgoszcz; Station No. 6 in Łódź; Staff of the Commander-in-Chief
- Commands: Intelligence Department, Staff of the Commander-in-Chief; Station No. 6 in Łódź; Deputy Chief, Station No. 3 in Bydgoszcz
- Conflicts: World War I Italian front Polish–Soviet War; World War II; Invasion of Poland
- Awards: Officer of the Order of the British Empire (OBE); Officer of the Legion of Merit; Cross of Valour; Gold Cross of Merit

Witold Karol Langenfeld (9 April 1896 – 30 December 1968) was a Polish Army and Polish Armed Forces in the West officer, a lieutenant colonel of communications, and a military intelligence officer of the Second Department of the Polish General Staff.

During the interwar period, Langenfeld served from 1935 to 1939 as deputy chief of Station No. 3 in Bydgoszcz, where he directed the technical execution of Operation "Wózek" (clandestine mail surveillance on German transit trains through the Polish Corridor) and supervised intelligence networks in the Free City of Danzig. In August 1939, he was appointed chief of the newly established Station No. 6 in Łódź, providing operational reconnaissance for Łódź Army. During World War II, he served in London as deputy chief and, from 1 January 1944, chief of the Intelligence Department of the Polish Staff of the Commander-in-Chief under Colonel Stanisław Gano, coordinating strategic intelligence liaison with the British Secret Intelligence Service (SIS) and the American Office of Strategic Services (OSS) in the period surrounding the Normandy landings. For his wartime liaison services, he was appointed an honorary Officer of the Order of the British Empire (OBE) and an officer of the American Legion of Merit.

== Early life ==
Witold Karol Langenfeld was born on 9 April 1896 in Lemberg (now Lviv, Ukraine), in the Kingdom of Galicia and Lodomeria, a crown land of Austria-Hungary, to Ferdynand Langenfeld and Jadwiga (née Zgórkiewicz). In 1914, he graduated from the 4th Classical Gymnasium in Lwów, obtaining his secondary school graduation certificate (matura), and enrolled in the Faculty of Mechanical Engineering at Lviv Polytechnic. His university studies were interrupted after two semesters when he was conscripted for military service.

== Military service ==
=== World War I and Polish–Soviet War ===
In 1917, Langenfeld entered the Austro-Hungarian Army, serving in the 22nd Rifle Regiment. In May 1917, he was assigned to the Reserve Officer School in Jägerndorf (Krnov) in Austrian Silesia, which he completed successfully. In March 1918, holding the rank of platoon sergeant (Zugsführer), he was deployed to the Italian front. During fighting along the Tagliamento river, he was taken prisoner of war by the Italian Army and remained interned until 26 December 1918.

Following his release from captivity, Langenfeld joined the newly forming Polish Army in France under General Józef Haller in late December 1918, receiving command of a company in the 6th Infantry Regiment. He was commissioned as a second lieutenant (podporucznik) in February 1919 and subsequently promoted to lieutenant (porucznik) of communications with seniority from 1 June 1919 (ranked 108th in 1923, 54th in 1924, and 26th in 1928).

In late 1919, Langenfeld was deployed with the 6th Infantry Division to the Lithuanian–Belorussian Front on the Polish–Soviet front. During the 1920 Soviet summer offensive, the division was attached to the Polish 2nd Army, engaging the Soviet 1st Cavalry Army of Semyon Budyonny in fighting at Yemilchyne, Rivne, Dubno, and Brody, before participating in the Polish counter-offensive toward the Sluch river. From June 1920, Langenfeld commanded the 6th Telegraph Company of the 6th Infantry Division (as of 1 June 1921, as an officer of the 1st Reserve Telegraph Battalion, he remained attached to the 6th Infantry Division). For his conduct under fire during the campaign, he was awarded the Cross of Valour.

=== Interwar service and military intelligence ===
Following the conclusion of hostilities, Langenfeld served as commander of the 5th Telegraph Company of the 2nd Communications Regiment in Jarosław, and between 1924 and 1928 was attached to the regiment's 6th training communications company. He was promoted to the rank of captain of communications with seniority from 1 January 1930 (rank 9). In 1932, he served as an instructor at the Communications Training Centre in Zegrze.

In January 1935, Langenfeld completed an intelligence and reconnaissance qualification course conducted by the Second Department of Polish General Staff (the military intelligence and counter-intelligence branch). In March 1935, he was posted to Station No. 3 of the General Staff in Bydgoszcz, which was responsible for intelligence coverage of north-western Germany and East Prussia. In Bydgoszcz, he served as head of the Offensive Counter-Intelligence Section, head of the Organizational Section, and until July 1939 as deputy to the station's chief, Major Jan Żychoń. He was promoted to major of communications with seniority from 19 March 1937 (rank 8).

As deputy chief of Station No. 3, Langenfeld helped organize and coordinate Operation "Wózek" ("Cart"), a clandestine intelligence operation that intercepted and examined German transit mail travelling by train across the Polish Corridor between mainland Germany and East Prussia. Langenfeld supervised covert microphotography darkrooms established near the railway junctions in Chojnice and Tczew, the fabrication of duplicate lead seals identical to those of the Deutsche Reichspost, and encrypted communications with General Staff headquarters in Warsaw.

Langenfeld also supervised human intelligence networks operating in the Free City of Danzig, serving as case officer for confidential agent Paulina Tyszewska (code name "Maria Ewald"), who was employed in the Danzig station of the German Abwehr under Major Reinhold Bruchardt. In January 1939, he accompanied Żychoń to Prague on a counterintelligence mission to observe and secure an operational meeting with the double agent Adam Twardowski.

By organizational orders effective 21 August 1939, Langenfeld was appointed chief of the newly formed Station No. 6 in Łódź, established to provide operational intelligence reconnaissance for the army inspectorate in the Łódź sector (Łódź Army). Station No. 6 assumed control of intelligence outposts in Częstochowa and Ostrów Wielkopolski, detached from Station No. 4 in Katowice.

=== World War II ===
Following the German invasion of Poland in September 1939, Langenfeld evacuated through Romania to France and subsequently to the United Kingdom, continuing his intelligence duties within the Polish Armed Forces in the West. In 1940, he became deputy chief of the Intelligence Department of the Staff of the Commander-in-Chief in London, serving under Major Jan Żychoń. Following Żychoń's transfer to frontline service with the Polish II Corps (Żychoń was later killed in action at the Battle of Monte Cassino), Langenfeld was appointed chief of the Intelligence Department on 1 January 1944, serving directly under the Chief of the Second Department, Colonel Stanisław Gano.

In this role during the preparation for the Normandy landings, Langenfeld directed intelligence liaison with the British Secret Intelligence Service (SIS) and the American Office of Strategic Services (OSS). He was critical of a proposal backed by National Defence Minister General Marian Kukiel to integrate Polish intelligence into the American "Eagle" operation in the spring of 1944, conducted in cooperation with OSS Major Joseph Dasher and planning to parachute 15 intelligence teams into Germany, citing excessive operational risks for the deployed agents. He was promoted to the rank of lieutenant colonel (podpułkownik) of communications. Following the end of hostilities in Europe, under the reorganization of the Intelligence-Information Department effective 1 August 1945, Langenfeld was assigned to handle the liquidation of the wartime intelligence network within Section "A" (Situational-Intelligence).

== Later life and death ==
On 26 September 1946, the Soviet-backed Provisional Government of National Unity under Prime Minister Edward Osóbka-Morawski stripped Langenfeld and 75 other senior Polish officers of their Polish citizenship. His citizenship was posthumously restored by the Polish government in 1971.

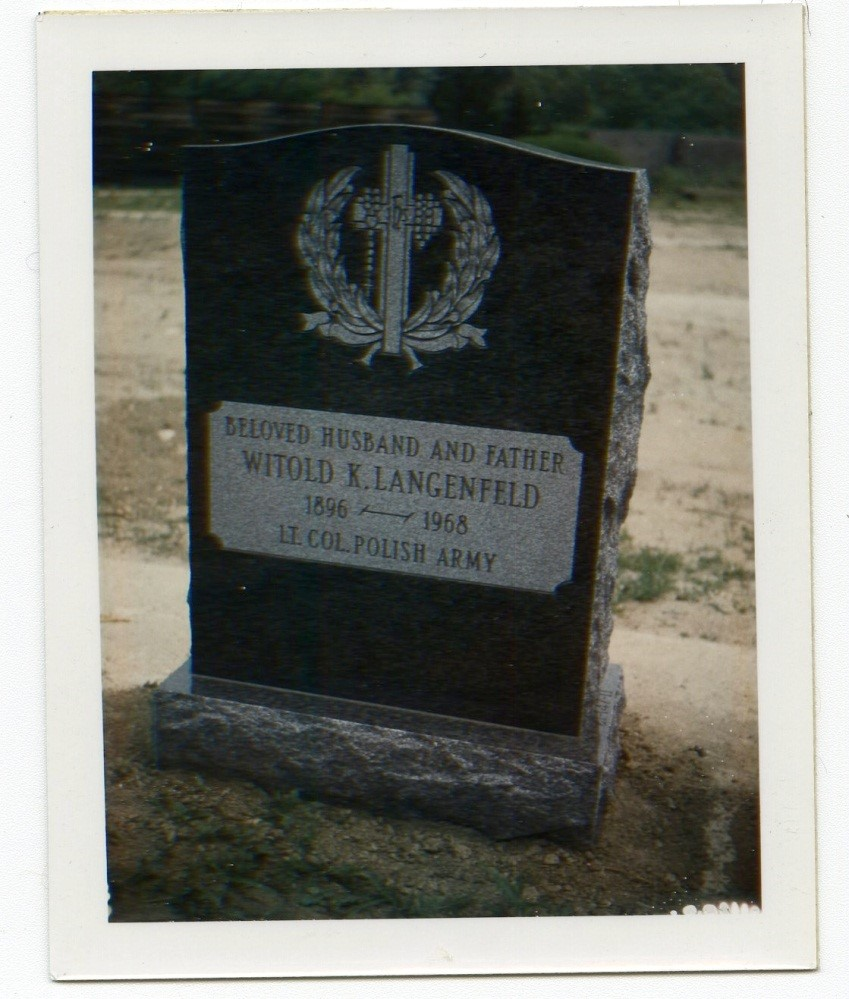
Grave of Witold Langenfeld at Gate of Heaven Cemetery in Hawthorne, New York

Langenfeld emigrated to the United States and settled in Yonkers, New York. He died in Yonkers on 30 December 1968, at the age of 72, and was buried at the Gate of Heaven Cemetery in Hawthorne, Westchester County, New York (Section 21, Plot 147, Grave No. 11).

His operational papers, manuscripts, and correspondence from his intelligence career were deposited with the Józef Piłsudski Institute of America in New York City, where they are preserved as an archival collection (Fonds No. 064 – Major Witold Langenfeld Papers).

== Military ranks ==
Rank	Date of rank	Seniority	Citation
Second lieutenant	February 1919	—	
Lieutenant	1 June 1919	1 June 1919	
Captain	1 January 1930	1 January 1930 (rank 9)	
Major	19 March 1937	19 March 1937 (rank 8)	
Lieutenant colonel	1944/1945	—	

== Honours and awards ==
- Officer of the Order of the British Empire (Military Division, United Kingdom, 1946)
- Officer of the Legion of Merit (United States, 1946)
- Cross of Valour (1920)
- Gold Cross of Merit (1938)
- Commemorative Badge of General Haller's Army (Haller Swords, 1921)
- Commemorative Medal for the War of 1918–1921
- Medal of the Tenth Anniversary of Regained Independence
- Inter-Allied Victory Medal (Médaille Interalliée, 1922)

== See also ==
- Second Department of Polish General Staff
- Stanisław Gano
- Karol Piasecki
