= Mieczysław Zygfryd Słowikowski =

Polish Army and intelligence officer

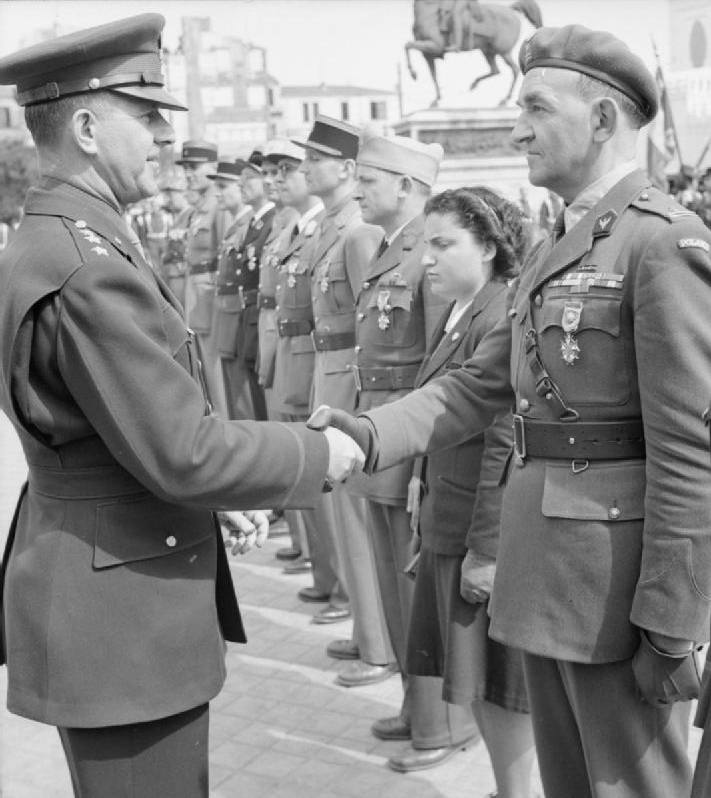
General Jacob Devers with Major Mieczysław "Rygor" Słowikowski, on awarding him the Legion of Merit for his invaluable contributions to the Allied North African campaign.

Mieczysław Zygfryd Słowikowski (Jazgarzew, near Warsaw, 1896–1989, London), also known as "Rygor-Słowikowski", was a Polish Army officer whose intelligence work in North Africa facilitated Allied preparations for the 1942 Operation Torch landings.

He has been described as "the only allied agent with a network in North Africa".

== Life ==
Słowikowski joined the Polish Army in 1915 and fought in the Polish-Soviet War of 1919–1921.

After completing advanced military studies in 1925, he worked at the Polish Ministry of Defense. For four years he served on Marshal Józef Piłsudski's staff. In 1937 he was transferred to the Ministry of Foreign Affairs and appointed secretary at the Polish Consulate in Kyiv in Soviet Ukraine. His actual function, however, was collecting intelligence in southern Russia.

Early in World War II, Słowikowski served in the Polish Army in France. When France capitulated to Adolf Hitler's Germany in June 1940, Słowikowski organized the clandestine evacuation of Polish military personnel, and later an intelligence service that reported to Polish military authorities in London.

In July 1941 Słowikowski left for Algiers, where (using the codename "Rygor" — Polish for "Rigor") he set up "Agency Africa," one of World War II's most successful intelligence organizations. His Polish allies in these endeavors included Lt. Col. Gwido Langer and Major Maksymilian Ciężki. The information gathered by the Agency was used by the Americans and British in planning the amphibious November 1942 Operation Torch landings in North Africa. These were the first large-scale Allied landings of the war, and their success in turn paved the way for the Allies' Italian campaign.

British historian M. R. D. Foot, in his foreword to Słowikowski's book In the Secret Service, writes:

Rygor, as he called himself [...], knew all the rules; and knew when to break them. Never go near children; but his son was with him, then in his earliest teens, and was a useful watchman. Never employ women on technical military tasks; but his wife helped him with his ciphering. Never go near the hostile security services; but he made friends with a disaffected senior police officer, who kept him and his family supplied with all the false papers they needed. In the teeth of every sort of obstacle — both locally, and in the shape of impractical instructions from the Poles in exile in London — he and the sub-agents he organized provided masses of data, military, economic and political, which played a leading part in the planning of operation 'Torch', the Anglo-American invasion of Algeria and Morocco in November 1942.

For his invaluable contributions to the Allied North African campaign, Słowikowski was on March 28, 1944, decorated with Britain's Order of the British Empire and received from General Jacob Devers, Deputy Commander-in-Chief of Allied Forces in North Africa, the American Legion of Merit. The ceremony was held on Algiers' Place du Gouvernement. Polish military authorities had already decorated Major Słowikowski in August 1943 with Poland's Gold Cross of Merit with Swords.

In September 1944 Słowikowski transferred to Great Britain, where he was posted to Scotland as chief of staff of the Polish Infantry Training Centre at Crieff.

Demobilized in 1947, he settled in London.

== TV documentary ==
The story of Słowikowski in French North Africa prior to the Allied Invasion (Operation Torch) is told in the documentary Les ombres de Casablanca (English: In the Shadows of Casablanca/Polish: Powrót do Casablanki), which also draws quite much from the film Casablanca. The documentary was released in 2009. It was directed by Malgosha Gago and Bolesław Sulik and produced by Arte France, Ideale Audience, TVN and Studio N-Art Inc.

== See also ==
- History of Polish Intelligence Services
- List of Poles
