= Station No. 4 of the Polish General Staff =

Polish military intelligence station (1921–1939)

- Ekspozytura Nr 4 Oddziału II Sztabu Głównego
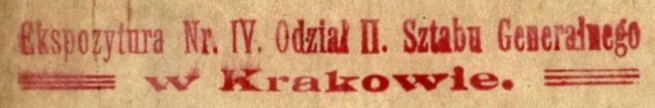
- Official stamp imprint of Station No. 4 of the Second Department
- Active: 1921 – September 1939
- Country: Second Polish Republic
- Branch: Polish Army
- Type: Military intelligence, counterintelligence
- Role: Tactical and operational intelligence, human intelligence, counterintelligence
- Part of: Bureau "West" (Referat „Zachód”), Department IIa, Second Department of Polish General Staff
- Headquarters: Kraków (1921–1930); Katowice (1930–1939)
- Engagements: World War II; Invasion of Poland

Commanders
- Notable commanders: Capt. Karol Franciszek Glazur; Lt. Col. Karol Piasecki; Maj. Kazimierz Szpądrowski; Maj. Stanisław Kuniczak (see full list)

Station No. 4 of the Polish General Staff (Ekspozytura Nr 4 Oddziału II Sztabu Głównego), also known as Station No. 4 in Katowice or Branch No. 4, was a regional operational military intelligence and counterintelligence station of the Second Polish Republic, active from 1921 until the outbreak of World War II in September 1939.

Directly subordinate to Bureau "West" (Referat „Zachód”) within Department IIa (Offensive Intelligence) of the Second Department of Polish General Staff (colloquially known as the Dwójka), the station was responsible for conducting tactical and operational reconnaissance (termed in interwar Polish military doctrine as "shallow intelligence", wywiad płytki) across an operational sector extending 100 to 150 kilometers (62 to 93 mi) into foreign territory, covering the southern frontier from Rawicz to the Carpathian Mountains.

Originally established in Kraków, the station was relocated in September 1930 to Katowice in the border region of Upper Silesia to provide immediate observation of Weimar Germany and later Nazi Germany. Its reconnaissance area encompassed the German military districts in Silesia (both Lower Silesia and Oppeln Silesia), parts of Bavaria, and following the 1938 Anschluss, Austria and partitioned Czechoslovakia (primarily the client Slovak Republic).

Between 1935 and 1939, under Major Kazimierz Szpądrowski, the station expanded its human intelligence (HUMINT) network inside Germany to dozens of recruited agents, conducted a counterintelligence operation against the Gestapo in Bytom, and identified German fortification lines along the Oder River. Upon the outbreak of war in September 1939, the station operated in tactical intelligence support of Army Kraków under General Antoni Szylling, while its former chief Major Szpądrowski served from 3 September 1939 as Chief of Section II (Intelligence) on the Army Kraków staff.

== Background and Kraków period (1921–1930) ==
Following the Peace of Riga in March 1921 and the conclusion of the border conflicts that defined the boundaries of the Second Polish Republic, the Polish General Staff reorganized its military intelligence apparatus onto a peacetime establishment by order of the Minister of Military Affairs, General Kazimierz Sosnkowski, on 22 June 1921. In place of the dissolved wartime intelligence sections of individual field armies, the Second Department formed territorial stations (singular: Ekspozytura, plural: Ekspozytury). While the primary operational effort of the Second Department was initially weighted toward the Soviet Union (Vector "East"), the necessity of monitoring German border garrisons, demilitarization compliance, and clandestine paramilitary formations along Poland's western and southwestern borders led to the maintenance of dedicated western stations in Poznań, Gdańsk, and Kraków.

Station No. 4 operated in Kraków, where on 10 September 1923 Captain Karol Franciszek Glazur was appointed as its commanding officer. Headquartered at ul. św. Marka 31 and later on ul. Warszawska, the station was assigned operational oversight over the southern frontier, facing German Silesia and the northern border of Czechoslovakia. In interwar Polish intelligence terminology, the station was classified as an organ of "shallow intelligence" (wywiad płytki). Unlike "deep intelligence" (wywiad głęboki), which was directed from the central headquarters in Warsaw and focused on strategic political decision-making, foreign ministries, and military high commands, shallow intelligence focused on an operational belt 100 to 150 km deep. Its principal objectives included:

- Tracking the garrison deployments, movements, and peacetime strengths of the German Reichswehr in Silesia;
- Monitoring cross-border transportation infrastructure, railway marshaling yards, and communication junctions;
- Observing German paramilitary and veteran organizations, such as the Stahlhelm and Freikorps successors;
- Establishing covert observation posts along the frontier in cooperation with local customs, police, and from 1928, the newly established Border Guard (Straż Graniczna).

Initially, each territorial station had a uniform four-element structure consisting of the station chief, a registry office, a quartermaster officer, and an Intelligence Section; under orders issued by the Second Department on 10 April 1927 and 24 June 1929, the internal structure was expanded to comprise the station chief, registry, Organizational Bureau, Studies (Records) Bureau, Counterintelligence Bureau, and a Technical Laboratory. During its Kraków period, the post was commanded in succession by Captain Glazur (1923–1925), Major Adam Studencki (1925–1927, subsequently head of Bureau "West" and Division IIa in Warsaw), Major August Nowosielski (1927–1928), and Captain (later Major) Ludwik Lucjan Sadowski (appointed in November 1928, who oversaw the relocation to Katowice in September 1930 and remained chief until August 1931).

== Relocation to Katowice (1930–1935) ==
In September 1930, the Second Department enacted a structural reorganization of its western intelligence network. While Kraków possessed administrative connections and lay behind the frontier, its geographical distance from the border impeded real-time tactical reconnaissance and rapid agent handling. Consequently, Station No. 4 was moved directly to Katowice, the administrative and economic center of the Autonomous Silesian Voivodeship.

The transfer placed the station immediately adjacent to the international boundary running through the industrial conurbation of Upper Silesia. Operating under civilian and commercial covers, the Katowice branch gained direct access to cross-border commuter traffic, mining syndicates, regional railway lines connecting Katowice with Gleiwitz, Beuthen, and Oppeln, and a bilingual borderland population.

Between 1 September 1931 and May 1935, the branch was commanded by Major (promoted to Lieutenant Colonel effective 1 January 1933) Karol Piasecki, a certified General Staff artillery officer who reorganized the operational reporting system and increased cooperation with the regional counterespionage divisions of the State Police. In July 1933, officers serving on the staff of Station No. 4 included Captains Julian Kołodziejczak, Kazimierz Kordaszewski, Leonard Macura, and Antoni Majta, and Lieutenant Franciszek Kretkowski, while subordinate officer posts were headed by Lieutenant Roman Królikowski (Officer Post No. 4 in Ostrów Wielkopolski) and Lieutenant Kazimierz Przemysław Szczepański (Officer Post No. 7); effective 1 September 1933, Captain Dr. Błażej Hanuszek was employed at the station as a contract official.

To establish surveillance over frontier crossings and railway corridors, the station also integrated personnel from the Border Guard. By 1934, two specialized Officer Intelligence Posts (Posterunki Oficerskie, PO) composed of seconded Border Guard officers operated under the Katowice station:

- Officer Post No. 3 in Katowice: Senior Commissioner Marian Skibiński and Commissioner Henryk Leśniewski;
- Officer Post No. 5 in Poznań: Commissioner Adam Biedrzyński and Subcommissioner Bogusław Skrzetuski.

== Command of Kazimierz Szpądrowski (1935–1939) ==
In June 1935, Major Kazimierz Szpądrowski, a certified General Staff artillery officer who had previously directed the Intelligence Training Section (Referat Wyszkolenia Wywiadowczego) at the Second Department central headquarters in Warsaw, succeeded Lieutenant Colonel Karol Piasecki as Chief of Station No. 4. Under Szpądrowski, the station expanded from border monitoring to deeper tactical intelligence collection on the Wehrmacht in Silesia.

=== Agent network expansion ===
Szpądrowski restructured the station's human intelligence operations, focusing recruitment on resident informants stationed inside German territory as well as cross-border couriers utilizing local border-crossing permits (karty cyrkulacyjne).

While in November 1937 the station had only three mobilization agents stationed in Germany, by 30 November 1938 its operational asset list numbered 62 peacetime intelligence agents (agenci ogólni) and 28 mobilization agents (agenci mobilizacyjni). These recruited sources were embedded in German railway administrative directorates, industrial plants in Upper and Lower Silesia, municipal transport departments, and frontier postal offices, providing regular reporting on German military troop movements, mobilization timetables, and fuel depots.

=== Technical Bureau development ===
The station also expanded its Technical Bureau (Referat Techniczny) to handle technical support locally and ensure operational independence. Out of a total station complement of approximately 30 personnel (including 16 operational intelligence officers and staff), technical personnel numbered five staff members, accounting for roughly one-sixth of the station's workforce. The bureau handled technical matters and operated a photographic laboratory producing reproductions of acquired documents.

=== Key operations and intelligence collection ===
During Szpądrowski's command, Station No. 4 carried out several operational initiatives:

- Operation "Per-Pethe" (1935): An operational deception game (gra inspiracyjna) directed against the Gestapo border post in Bytom (Grenzpolizeikommissariat Beuthen). By feeding controlled material to German handlers, the station mapped the personnel roster, investigative methods, and local informant network of the Bytom Gestapo.
- 1:300,000 Operational Staging Map (1937): In September 1937, the station compiled field reports into an operational map at 1:300,000 scale, charting German screening forces, assembly areas, march axes, and forward staging areas (przedpole) in German Silesia.
- Oder Fortifications and Signal Infrastructure: In 1937–1938, station agents located and mapped German fortification construction directorates, concrete bunker lines along the Oder River southeast of Nowa Sól (Neusalz), and defensive earthworks east of Frankfurt (Oder). Agents also identified secret wartime telephone switchboards prepared in the basements of district administrative buildings, courts, and town halls in Opole Silesia for use as forward command posts.

=== Conflict over intelligence assessments (1938–1939) ===
Following the Munich Agreement in September 1938, Station No. 4 reported German troop movements, the redeployment of the German VIII Army Corps, and assembly areas in the Sudetenland and Silesia.

Szpądrowski's warnings regarding the pace of German mobilization and the exposure of the southern frontier led to friction with the Chief of the Polish General Staff, Brigadier General Wacław Stachiewicz, who regarded them as overly open criticism of superior officers' estimates. On 31 January 1939, Szpądrowski was recalled from command of Station No. 4 and, effective 1 February 1939, transferred to command the III Battalion of the 6th Heavy Artillery Regiment in Lwów.

== Eve of World War II (February – August 1939) ==
On 1 February 1939, Major Stanisław Kuniczak, a certified General Staff artillery officer, assumed command of Station No. 4.

=== Subordinate network in late 1938 ===
In late 1938, prior to the spring 1939 reorganizations, the station's subordinate field network comprised four fixed officer posts (Posterunki Oficerskie, PO) and two mobile intelligence groups (Grupy Wywiadowcze, GW): (Note: Leszek Gondek (1982, p. 111) listed officer posts in Częstochowa and Nowy Targ as already existing in 1938, while omitting the mobile intelligence groups. Subsequent archival research by Łukasz Ulatowski (2013, pp. 92–94) established that the Częstochowa and Nowy Targ outposts were created in spring 1939 following the German occupation of Bohemia and Moravia, while two mobile intelligence groups operated throughout 1938.)

- Officer Post No. 1 in Cieszyn: Captain Julian Lesiński;
- Officer Post No. 2 in Chorzów: Captain Kazimierz Szczepański;
- Officer Post No. 3 in Leszno: Captain Bolesław Górnik;
- Officer Post No. 4 in Ostrów Wielkopolski: Captain Józef Wiklicki;
- Intelligence Group I: Captain Franciszek Kretkowski;
- Intelligence Group II: Captain Mieczysław Karol Kurkowski.

=== Realignments during the Czechoslovak crisis (February – June 1939) ===
In February 1939, the numbering of the station's Upper Silesian officer posts was revised: the existing Officer Post No. 1 in Chorzów was redesignated as Officer Post No. 2, while Officer Post No. 2 in Katowice was designated as Officer Post No. 1.

On 15 March 1939, Germany occupied the Czech lands, establishing the Protectorate of Bohemia and Moravia, while the Slovak Republic became a German client state. This lengthened Poland's exposed southern border by over 800 kilometers.

To address this southern flank, the Second Department reorganized the station's outposts:

- Subordination of Cieszyn Post: On 25 March 1939, Bureau "East" of the Second Department transferred Officer Post No. 1 (I) in Cieszyn, commanded by Captain Adam Piasecki, to the operational authority of Station No. 4.
- Creation of Nowy Targ Post: On 20 April 1939, the existing Cieszyn outpost (Officer Post No. 1 (II)) under Captain Julian Lesiński was moved east from Cieszyn to Nowy Targ in the foothills of the Carpathian Mountains and redesignated as Officer Post No. 5, tasked with monitoring German troop concentrations and military road construction in northern Slovakia.
- Establishment of Częstochowa Post: On 1 June 1939, Officer Post No. 3 in Częstochowa commenced operations under Captain Józef Skarplik to reinforce surveillance over the boundary between Upper Silesia and central Poland.

=== Pre-war dispositions (August 1939) ===
On 23 August 1939, the First Deputy Chief of the General Staff, Brigadier General Janusz Głuchowski, ordered the headquarters of Station No. 4 to evacuate its main offices from Katowice back to Kraków to prevent capture of cryptographic material and records in the immediate border zone.

By organizational orders effective 21 August 1939, the Polish General Staff detached the northern outposts in Częstochowa and Ostrów Wielkopolski from Station No. 4 to form the nucleus of a newly created field station, Station No. 6 in Łódź (Ekspozytura Nr 6), commanded by Major Witold Langenfeld and designated to support Army Łódź.

== Organization and personnel in spring 1939 ==
In the spring of 1939, as the Second Department adapted to wartime mobilization preparations, the station's internal staff underwent structural realignment between its peacetime roster in March and its wartime mobilization establishment in April. (Note: In confidential army personnel records (such as the Rocznik oficerski 1939), intelligence officers attached to the Second Department were officially listed as being "at the disposal of the Chief of the Personnel Bureau of the Ministry of Military Affairs" (w dyspozycji szefa Biura Personalnego MSWojsk.) to provide civilian cover, while de facto forming the active personnel reserve of the Second Department (Rybka & Stepan 2006, pp. IX, 432).) Internal departments of the station were organized as bureaus (referaty, sing. referat), led by a bureau chief (kierownik referatu) and staffed by case officers (referenci).

Internal Staff Comparison of Station No. 4 (Spring 1939)
Position in March 1939 (Peacetime)	Officer (Rank and branch)	Position in April 1939 (Mobilization)
Chief of Station	Major Stanisław Kuniczak (artillery / General Staff)	Chief of Station
Deputy Chief	Major Zygmunt Waydowicz (infantry)	Deputy Chief
Head of Registry Bureau	Captain Rajmund Kawalec (administration / infantry)	Head of Offensive Counterintelligence Bureau
Head of Technical Bureau	Captain Antoni Majta (administration / artillery)	Case Officer, Offensive Intelligence Organization Bureau
Head of Organization Bureau	Captain Władysław Ludwik Umański (administration / artillery)	Head of Offensive Intelligence Organization Bureau
Case Officer, Organization Bureau	Captain Karol Ludwik Zborowski (administration / infantry)	Head of Registry Bureau
Head of General Bureau	Captain Michał Hieronim Gawryś (infantry)	Head of Technical Bureau

== September 1939 campaign and wartime dissolution ==
During the September 1939 campaign, duplicate reporting files, historical card indexes, and intelligence summaries forwarded over preceding years to the Central Archives of the Second Department at Fort Legionów in Warsaw fell intact into German hands after the capitulation of Warsaw in late September 1939, enabling the Abwehr and Gestapo to identify and arrest numerous Polish agents in Silesia.

Following the German and Soviet invasions in September 1939:

- Former commander Major Kazimierz Szpądrowski, who had been appointed head of the intelligence section of Operational Group "Silesia" on 28 August 1939 and assumed the post of Chief of Section II (Intelligence) on the Staff of Kraków Army on 3 September 1939 (following the death in action of Lieutenant Colonel Marian Zdon), was dispatched on 13 September from Zamość to Lwów and took part in the defense of Lwów. Taken into Soviet captivity after the city's capitulation on 22 September 1939 and interned in the Starobilsk camp, he was identified by the NKVD in early 1940, transferred to Lefortovo Prison in Moscow, and executed on 25 December 1940.
- Former commander Lieutenant Colonel Karol Piasecki served during the campaign as Chief of Section II (Intelligence) of Łódź Army and subsequently of Warszawa Army during the siege of Warsaw, evacuating by air on 27 September 1939 to Kaunas, Lithuania, aboard the prototype light bomber PZL.46 Sum.
- Early commander Captain Karol Franciszek Glazur was captured by Soviet forces, held in the Kozelsk camp, and executed by the NKVD in the Katyn massacre in April 1940, while former station contract official Captain Dr. Błażej Hanuszek was held at Starobilsk and executed by the NKVD in Kharkiv in the spring of 1940.
- Major Stanisław Kuniczak, Deputy Chief Major Zygmunt Waydowicz, Captain Rajmund Kawalec, and several other staff officers crossed the Romanian border into France and the United Kingdom, where they served in the reconstituted Second Department of the Commander-in-Chief's Staff in London (directed from December 1941 by Colonel Stanisław Gano) and at the Polish Intelligence Officers' School, continuing intelligence work for the Polish government-in-exile and the Polish Armed Forces in the West.

Commanding Officers of Station No. 4 (1923–1939)
No.	Portrait	Name and rank	Term of office	Notes
1		Captain Karol Franciszek Glazur	10 September 1923 – 1925	First documented commanding officer.
2		Major Adam Studencki	1925 – June 1927	Subsequently head of Referat "Zachód" (German Desk, 1927–1929) and Independent Section IIa (Offensive Intelligence, 1929) at General Staff headquarters in Warsaw.
3		Major August Nowosielski	June 1927 – November 1928	
4		Major Ludwik Lucjan Sadowski	November 1928 – August 1931	Oversaw the station's relocation from Kraków to Katowice in September 1930.
5		Major Karol Piasecki	1 September 1931 – May 1935	
6		Major Kazimierz Szpądrowski	June 1935 – 31 January 1939	Former head of the Intelligence Training Section (Referat Wyszkolenia) at General Staff headquarters.
7		Major Stanisław Kuniczak	1 February 1939 – September 1939	Final commanding officer.
