= Karol Piasecki =

Polish military officer, intelligence chief, and restaurateur (1897–1953)

- Karol Piasecki as Lieutenant Colonel of the Polish Army (c. 1934)
- Born: Karol Piasecki; 20 January 1897; Zator, Kingdom of Galicia and Lodomeria, Austria-Hungary
- Died: 11 July 1953 (aged 56); Los Angeles, California, United States
- Burial place: Holy Cross Cemetery, Culver City, California, U.S.
- Spouse(s): Anna Piasecka (née Mayer); Alina Piasecka
- Military career
- Allegiance: Poland; Austria-Hungary (1917–1918)
- Branch: Polish Legions; Austro-Hungarian Army; Polish Army; Polish Armed Forces in the West
- Service years: 1914–1935, 1939–1942
- Rank: Lieutenant colonel
- Nickname: "Koryński"
- Units: 1st Artillery Regiment of the Polish Legions; 1st Legions Field Artillery Regt. 1st Heaviest Artillery Regt. Wawelberg Group; Second Department; Staff, Łódź Army & Warszawa Army
- Commands: 3rd Battery, 1st Legions Field Artillery Regt. Subgroup "Krapkowice" (Silesia); Station No. 4 (Katowice), Second Department; Section II (Intelligence), Łódź Army & Warszawa Army
- Conflicts: World War I Polish–Ukrainian War; Defense of Lwów; Polish–Soviet War; Third Silesian Uprising; World War II; Invasion of Poland; Siege of Warsaw (1939)
- Awards: Virtuti Militari (Silver Cross, No. 558); Cross of Independence; Cross of Valour (6 times); Gold Cross of Merit
- Other work: Company director, restaurateur (owner of Ham and Eggs Restaurant in Los Angeles)

Karol Piasecki (20 January 1897 – 11 July 1953) was a Polish military officer, certified General Staff artillery officer, independence activist, intelligence officer, and recipient of the Virtuti Militari. He served as Chief of Station No. 4 in Katowice within the Second Department of Polish General Staff (1931–1935) and as Chief of Intelligence (Section II) for Łódź Army and Warszawa Army during the 1939 September Campaign. On 27 September 1939, during the final days of the siege of Warsaw, he carried command dispatches during an aerial evacuation to Lithuania aboard the prototype light bomber PZL.46 Sum. Depending on historical accounts, he was subsequently either held as a German prisoner of war in an Oflag or evacuated via France and Great Britain to the United States, where he collaborated with Polish intelligence outposts in New York (1942–1945). After World War II, he settled in Los Angeles, California, where he owned and operated the Ham and Eggs Restaurant.

== Early life and education ==
Karol Piasecki was born on 20 January 1897 in Zator, in the Wadowice district of the Kingdom of Galicia and Lodomeria, a crown land of Austria-Hungary. He was the son of Jan Piasecki and Franciszka (née Żmudzińska).

Piasecki completed five years of primary school in Zator, followed by three years of secondary school (gymnasium) in Kraków. He then transferred to the Imperial and Royal Secondary School in Krosno, completing the fourth and fifth forms during the 1913/1914 school year. In Krosno, he was a member of the pro-independence Riflemen's Association.

== Military career ==
=== First World War and Polish–Soviet War ===
On 16 August 1914, following the outbreak of World War I, Piasecki enlisted in the Polish Legions. He served in the artillery, initially in the 2nd Battery and subsequently in the 4th Battery of the 1st Artillery Regiment. From 1 August to 9 October 1916, he attended the artillery school in Rembertów, and on 1 December 1916 he was promoted to corporal. On 4 April 1917, the regimental command nominated him for the Austrian Karl Troop Cross. Following the Oath crisis in 1917, he was conscripted into the Austro-Hungarian Army, serving from 20 September 1917 to 30 October 1918.

From 31 October 1918, Piasecki took part in the defense of Lwów during the Polish–Ukrainian War, fighting on Sector VI (Subsector Rzęsna Polska) and Sector I (Subsector Cadet School). On 17 November 1918, while commanding an infantry platoon with the rank of artillery sergeant (ogniomistrz), he was wounded in action (in rosters of the defense of Lwów he is recorded as a second lieutenant wounded on 12 November). From January 1919, he commanded the "Ślimak" machine gun platoon, and was cited for his actions on 17 February 1919 near Gródek Jagielloński. On 18 March 1919, as a former Polish Legions non-commissioned officer serving in the 1st Legions Field Artillery Regiment, he was commissioned as a second lieutenant of artillery, with seniority backdated to 1 March 1919. He was again cited for his actions on 14 May 1919 at Chyrów.

During the Polish–Soviet War (1919–1920), Piasecki commanded the 3rd Battery of the 1st Legions Field Artillery Regiment. He was commended for his actions on 9 July 1920 near Aleksandria, and on 22 August 1920 in Białystok he engaged a Soviet armored train in an artillery duel, enabling Polish infantry to capture it. For combat actions against Ukrainian and Bolshevik forces, he was decorated on 1 September 1920 with the Silver Cross of the Virtuti Militari (Fifth Class, cross number 558). On 20 September 1920, his promotion to captain of artillery was confirmed, with seniority effective 1 April 1920, in the group of officers of the former Polish Legions.

=== Silesian Uprisings and covert operations ===
In May 1921, Piasecki was assigned by Section II of the Polish Supreme Command to work in Upper Silesia.

During the Third Silesian Uprising in May 1921, Piasecki used the nom de guerre "Koryński". He commanded a demolition detachment in Subgroup "Krapkowice" of the Wawelberg Group, and subsequently served as adjutant to the commander of the Prince Józef Poniatowski 2nd Bytom Infantry Regiment.

=== Interwar service and military intelligence ===
Following the wars, Piasecki was granted a military settlement plot in Adampol, in the Niehniewicze commune of Nowogródek Voivodeship. As of 1 June 1921, he remained on the rolls of the 1st Legions Field Artillery Regiment with the rank of captain. In early 1922, he was demobilized into the reserve of the 1st Legions Field Artillery Regiment.

In April 1923, as a reserve officer, he was recalled to active duty with his parent regiment in the Vilnius (then Wilno) garrison. On 8 January 1924, he was confirmed in the rank of captain with seniority from 1 June 1919 (rank 638 in the reserve artillery officers corps), and on 23 August 1924 he was transferred to the career officer corps effective 1 July 1924 in the rank of captain with seniority from 1 July 1919 (rank 19 in the corps of artillery officers). Following the May Coup of 1926, he was assigned to the Artillery Department of the Ministry of Military Affairs in Warsaw. He was promoted to major of artillery on 18 February 1928, with seniority from 1 January 1928 (rank 35). In July 1929, he was transferred to the 1st Heaviest Artillery Regiment in Warsaw as a battalion commander.

After completing a preparatory course and required line service, Piasecki was admitted on 23 December 1929 to the Higher War School (Wyższa Szkoła Wojenna) in Warsaw as a student of the two-year staff officer course (class of 1929/1931).

Effective 1 September 1931, upon graduating and receiving the academic diploma of a certified General Staff officer (oficer dyplomowany), Piasecki was transferred to Station No. 4 of the Second Department of Polish General Staff in Katowice as Chief of the Station. On 17 January 1933, he was promoted to Lieutenant colonel of artillery, with seniority from 1 January 1933 (rank 22).

Piasecki headed Station No. 4 until May 1935, handing over his duties to Major Kazimierz Szpądrowski. Effective 30 June 1935, he was placed on the retired list due to permanent medical unfitness for professional military service. In civilian life, he lived in Gdynia, working as a director of the company "Progress". On 23 March 1939, he was recalled to active service and assigned to the staff of Army Inspector Major General Juliusz Rómmel as Chief of Section II (Intelligence), serving until 3 June 1939.

== World War II ==
=== Defense of Poland and the Siege of Warsaw ===
In August 1939, Piasecki was mobilized as Chief of Section II (Intelligence) on the Staff of Łódź Army, commanded by Major General Juliusz Rómmel.

Following the withdrawal of Łódź Army toward Warsaw, Piasecki reached the capital with the army headquarters. On 8 September 1939, Rómmel assumed command of Warszawa Army, with Piasecki continuing as Chief of Section II of the army staff throughout the Siege of Warsaw (1939). For his service during the siege, he was awarded the Cross of Valour twice more by General Rómmel on 29 September 1939, bringing his total to six citations.

=== Aerial evacuation on the PZL.46 "Sum" ===
Second prototype of the PZL.46 Sum, flown by Piasecki and crew from Warsaw to Kaunas

On the morning of 27 September 1939, as Warsaw prepared for capitulation, General Rómmel dispatched a courier flight to deliver command reports and military dispatches to the Polish Supreme Commander, Marshal Edward Rydz-Śmigły, who was interned in Romania.

At 04:30 AM, the second prototype of the PZL.46/II "Sum" light reconnaissance bomber took off from the damaged runway at Pole Mokotowskie airfield in central Warsaw. Piloted by engineer Stanisław Riess, with observer Jerzy Fabisiak and mechanic Wiktor Szumowski, the aircraft carried Lieutenant Colonel Piasecki as the courier of the army command.

With southern flight routes cut off by German forces, Riess flew northeast toward neutral Lithuania, landing at Aleksotas aerodrome in Kaunas. Lithuanian authorities impounded the aircraft and interned Piasecki and the crew.

=== Internment and wartime intelligence service ===
Accounts of Piasecki's subsequent wartime path differ in historical literature. According to one version, following the annexation of Lithuania by the Soviet Union and the subsequent outbreak of the German–Soviet war, Piasecki fell into German captivity and was held as a prisoner of war in an Oflag.

According to findings of the Anglo-Polish Historical Committee (Polsko-Brytyjska Komisja Historyczna) and historians Tadeusz Dubicki and Andrzej Suchcitz, after the September 1939 campaign Piasecki was in Hungary and Romania, and in the spring of 1940 was stationed at the camp in Vichy, France. After being evacuated to Great Britain, he stayed at the officers' camp in Rothesay on the Isle of Bute, and in 1942 was declared medically unfit for military service. From 1942 he resided in the United States, where he collaborated with Lieutenant Zygmunt Krosnowski, head of the "Magdalen" intelligence outpost in New York City, subordinate to Field Station "Estezet" (Ekspozytura "Estezet"). From February 1945 (formalized by an agreement signed on 19 February 1945 by Colonel Stanisław Gano, Chief of the Second Department of the Supreme Commander's Staff, and Lieutenant Colonel Piasecki), he was designated to take over the two-person Independent Intelligence Station "Savoy" (Samodzielna Placówka Wywiadowcza "Savoy") in New York, operating under the cover of a commercial enterprise with an initial budget of $2,000 and tasked initially with gathering information on attitudes among Polish Americans.

== Emigration and life in Los Angeles ==
After the war, Piasecki remained in exile in the United States and settled in California. In Los Angeles, he was the owner and operator of the Ham and Eggs Restaurant.

According to pre-war military personnel records, he was married to Anna (née Mayer), whereas in his 1953 American obituary his surviving wife was listed as Alina Piasecka. In Los Angeles, he was associated with Our Lady of the Bright Mount Church, the Polish-American parish located on West Adams Boulevard.

== Death ==
Karol Piasecki died on 11 July 1953 in Los Angeles, at the age of 56.

Funeral services were held at Our Lady of the Bright Mount Church, followed by burial at Holy Cross Cemetery in Culver City, California.

== Military ranks ==
Rank	Date of rank	Seniority
Corporal	1 December 1916	–
Second lieutenant	18 March 1919	1 March 1919
Captain	20 September 1920	1 April 1920 (reserve seniority from 1 June 1919, rank 638; career seniority from 1 July 1919, rank 19)
Major	18 February 1928	1 January 1928 (rank 35)
Lieutenant colonel	17 January 1933	1 January 1933 (rank 22)

== Honours and awards ==
- Virtuti Militari, Silver Cross (Fifth Class, No. 558) – awarded 1 September 1920, decree of 16 February 1921
- Cross of Independence – 6 June 1931, "for work in the cause of regaining independence"
- Cross of Valour, awarded six times:
  - Four citations for combat actions during the 1918–1921 campaigns
  - Two citations for the Siege of Warsaw (1939), awarded 29 September 1939 by General Juliusz Rómmel
- Gold Cross of Merit – 10 November 1928
- Commemorative Badge "For Faithful Service" (Odznaka „Za wierną służbę”) of the 1st Brigade of the Polish Legions

== See also ==
- Station No. 4 of the Polish General Staff
- Second Department of Polish General Staff
- PZL.46 Sum
- Juliusz Rómmel
- Kazimierz Szpądrowski
