= Battle of Łódź =

Battle of Łódź may refer to:

- Battle of Łódź (1914) during World War I
- Battle of Łódź (1939) during the German invasion of Poland
