= Kazimierz Szpądrowski =

Polish Army officer and military intelligence commander (1899–1940)

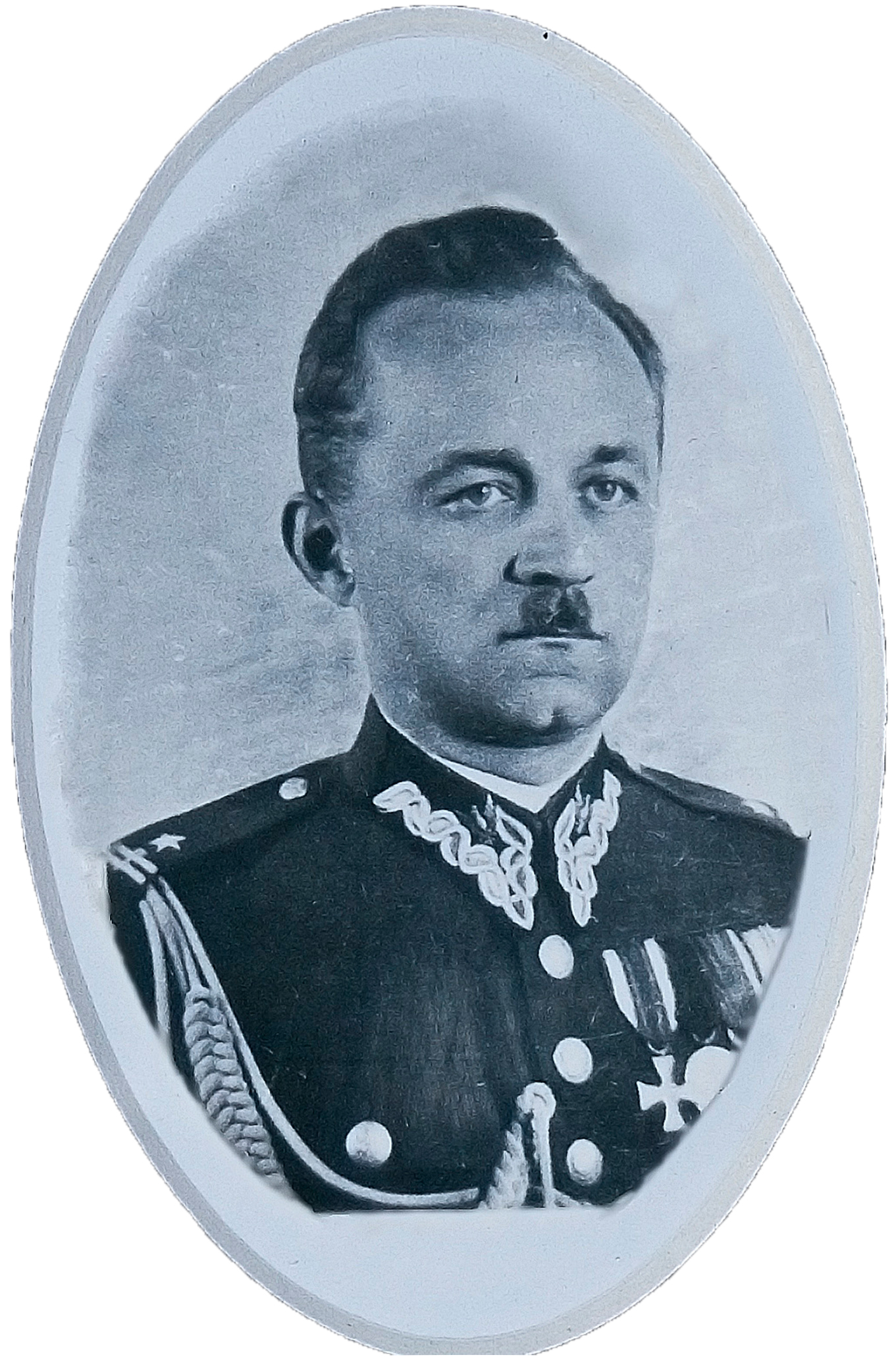
- Major Kazimierz Szpądrowski (c. 1939)
- Born: Kazimierz Stanisław Szpądrowski; 1 March 1899; Krościenko nad Dunajcem, Kingdom of Galicia and Lodomeria, Austria-Hungary
- Died: 25 December 1940 (aged 41); Lefortovo Prison, Moscow, Russian SFSR, Soviet Union
- Burial place: Mass grave No. 1, Donskoye Cemetery, Moscow
- Military career
- Allegiance: Poland
- Branch: Polish Legions; Austro-Hungarian Army; Polish Army
- Service years: 1916–1940
- Rank: Major (Lieutenant colonel, posthumous)
- Units: 1st Artillery Regiment of the Polish Legions; 1st Field Artillery Regiment; 6th Field Artillery Regiment; 7th Field Artillery Regiment; 26th Field Artillery Regiment; Artillery Officer School in Toruń; Second Department of the General Staff; 6th Heavy Artillery Regiment; Staff, Kraków Army
- Commands: Station No. 4 in Katowice (1935–1939); III Battalion, 6th Heavy Artillery Regt. (1939); Section II (Intelligence), Kraków Army (1939)
- Conflicts: World War I; Polish–Soviet War; World War II; Invasion of Poland; Defense of Lwów
- Awards: Commander's Cross of the Order of Polonia Restituta (posthumous); Cross of Valour; Gold Cross of Merit; Medal of Independence; Silver Cross of Merit; Bronze Medal for Long Service

Kazimierz Stanisław Szpądrowski (1 March 1899 – 25 December 1940) was a Polish Army artillery officer, certified General Staff officer, and military intelligence commander of the Second Department of the General Staff. From 1935 to 1939, he served as Chief of Station No. 4 in Katowice, directing tactical reconnaissance and human intelligence operations against Germany along the Upper and Lower Silesian border.

During the September 1939 invasion of Poland, Szpądrowski was appointed Chief of Intelligence of Kraków Army. Following the encirclement of the army staff, he took part in the defense of Lwów against German forces. Following the Soviet invasion of Poland, he was taken into Soviet captivity after the city's surrender and interned in the Starobilsk camp. In early 1940, the Soviet NKVD identified him as a Polish General Staff intelligence officer and transferred him to Moscow's Lefortovo Prison. Throughout nine months of interrogation, Szpądrowski adhered to his military oath and refused to disclose operational networks, agent identities, or secret ciphers. He was sentenced to death by the Military Collegium of the Supreme Court of the Soviet Union and executed by firing squad on 25 December 1940.

Szpądrowski was officially rehabilitated by the Chief Military Prosecutor's Office of the Russian Federation in 1992. He was posthumously promoted to lieutenant colonel in 1998 and decorated with the Commander's Cross of the Order of Polonia Restituta by the President of Poland in 2009.

== Early life and education ==
Szpądrowski was born on 1 March 1899 in Krościenko nad Dunajcem, in the Kingdom of Galicia and Lodomeria, a crown land of Austria-Hungary (now in Nowy Targ County, Poland). He was the son of Ignacy Szpądrowski and Teresa (née Zarzycka), both teachers at the local elementary school. He attended elementary school in Krościenko before entering the Imperial-Royal Gymnasium in Wadowice (now the Marcin Wadowita High School). Between 1912 and 1914, he was active in the pro-independence Polish Rifle Squads (Polskie Drużyny Strzeleckie) in the Wadowice district. He lost both parents in his youth; his father died in 1915 and his mother in 1917. On 14 December 1916, he passed his secondary school exit examination (matura) with honours.

== World War I and Polish–Soviet War ==
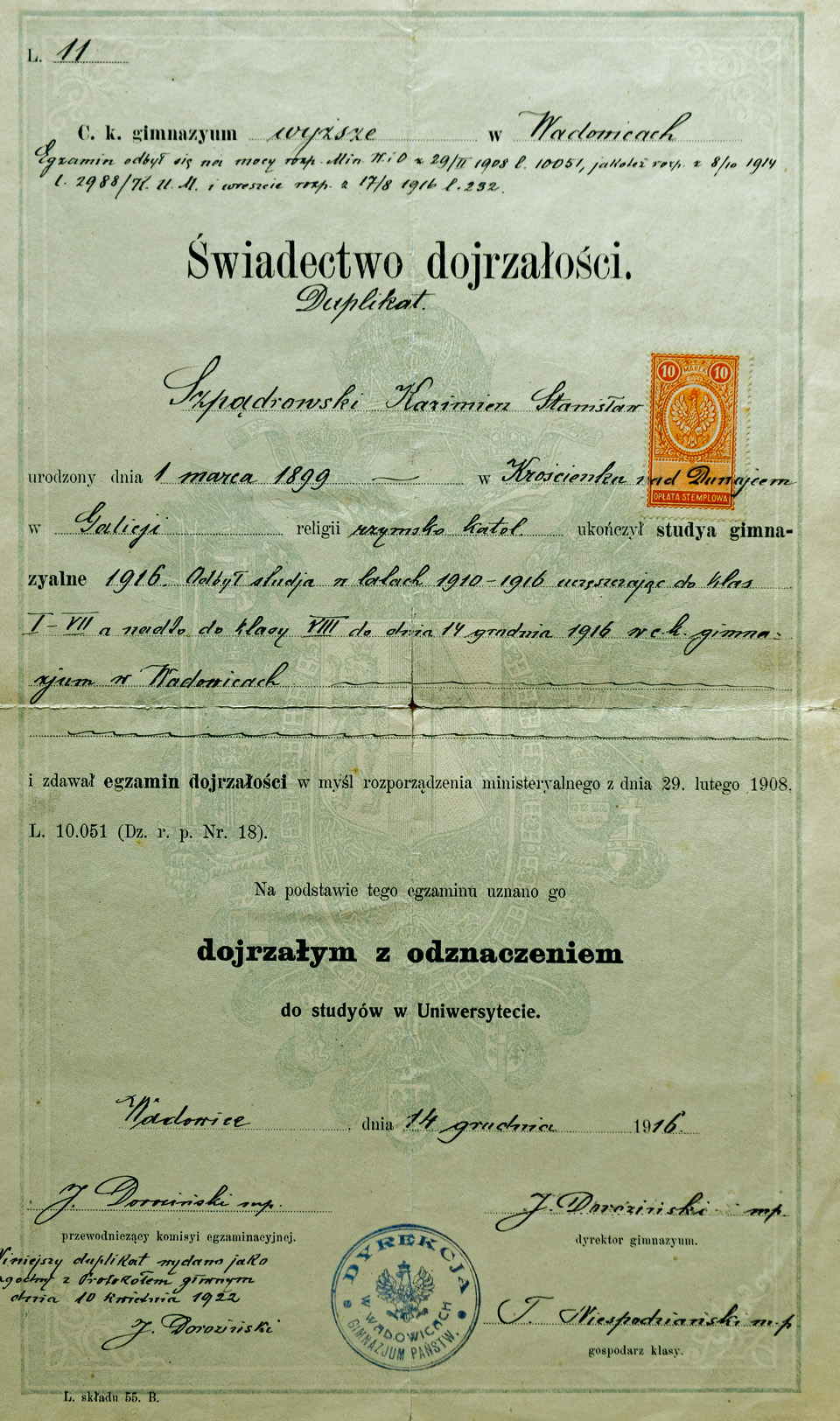
Szpądrowski's graduation certificate (matura) from the Wadowice Gymnasium (1916)

On 14 December 1916, immediately after completing his examinations, Szpądrowski volunteered at Góra Kalwaria for the Polish Legions. From 5 January to 20 August 1917, he served in the 2nd Battery of the 1st Artillery Regiment of the Polish Legions. Following the July 1917 Oath crisis, when legionnaires refused to swear an oath of brotherhood in arms with German and Austro-Hungarian forces, he was conscripted into the Austro-Hungarian Army, serving until 5 November 1918.

On 6 November 1918, Szpądrowski joined the newly forming Polish Army in Warsaw with the rank of warrant officer, assigned to the 1st Field Artillery Regiment. By decree of Commander-in-Chief Józef Piłsudski on 16 January 1919, he was commissioned as a second lieutenant with seniority retroactive to 6 January 1919. On 1 June 1919, he was promoted to lieutenant while serving in the 6th Field Artillery Regiment.

During the Polish–Soviet War (1919–1921), Szpądrowski served with the 7th Field Artillery Regiment, participating in combat operations on the front lines from 31 March to 25 September 1919 and from 16 February 1920 to 14 March 1921. For his conduct under fire during the campaign, he was decorated with the Cross of Valour. After the cessation of hostilities, he remained on active duty with the 7th Field Artillery Regiment, and on 3 May 1922 was verified in the rank of lieutenant with seniority from 1 June 1919 (ranked 609th in the corps of artillery officers in 1923, and 303rd in 1924).

== Interwar military career ==
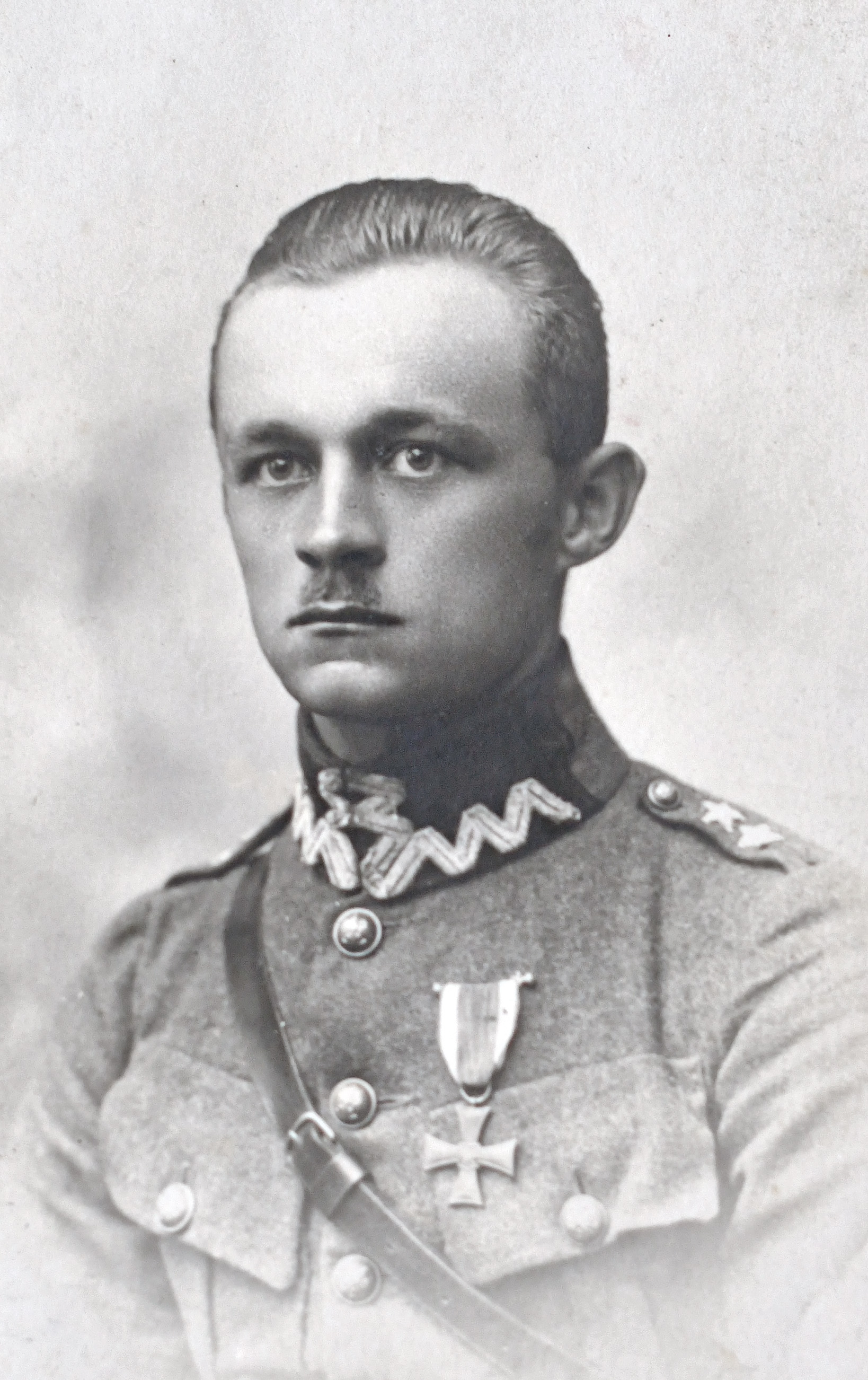
Szpądrowski as a young artillery officer decorated with the Cross of Valour (1920s)

Between 1 February and 11 December 1922, Szpądrowski completed the Artillery Junior Officers' School in Toruń. In 1923, he was assigned to the newly established Artillery Officer School (Oficerska Szkoła Artylerii) in Toruń, where he served as an instructor and class commander in the training battalion, while listed in 1923–1924 as a supernumerary officer of the 26th Field Artillery Regiment in Skierniewice. On 1 January 1928, he was promoted to captain with seniority from 1 January 1928 (ranked 42nd in the corps of artillery officers in 1928, and 36th in 1932), and following the reorganization of the institution into the Artillery Officer Cadet School (Szkoła Podchorążych Artylerii), he was appointed school adjutant. He subsequently returned to line service with the 7th Field Artillery Regiment in Częstochowa. Brigadier General Mieczysław Dąbkowski, commander of the 7th Infantry Division, evaluated him at the time as "the best officer of the 7th Field Artillery Regiment", citing his instructional ability and conscientiousness. In 1930, he was decorated with the Silver Cross of Merit.

From 16 June 1930 to 31 October 1932, Szpądrowski studied at the Higher War School (Wyższa Szkoła Wojenna) in Warsaw as an officer student of the 11th Regular Course. Upon graduation, he qualified as a certified General Staff officer. The school commandant, Brigadier General Tadeusz Kutrzeba, assessed him as an officer of strong individuality, recognized authority, and high work ethic. On 1 November 1932, Szpądrowski was transferred to the Second Department of the General Staff in Warsaw.

=== Chief of Station No. 4 in Katowice (1935–1939) ===
In June 1935, Szpądrowski was appointed Chief of Station No. 4 (Ekspozytura Nr 4) in Katowice, succeeding Lieutenant Colonel Karol Piasecki. Station No. 4 served as the primary field intelligence organ of the Polish General Staff directed against Germany along the Upper Silesian and Lower Silesian borders, conducting shallow reconnaissance and offensive counterintelligence. The station comprised approximately 30 personnel, including 16 operational intelligence staff and five personnel in a Technical Section expanded by Szpądrowski to ensure operational independence. The station maintained subordinate Officer Intelligence Posts (Posterunki Oficerskie) in Chorzów, Cieszyn, Częstochowa, Ostrów Wielkopolski, and Nowy Targ.

During his tenure, the station expanded its clandestine reporting network inside Germany. In November 1937, Station No. 4 maintained three active mobilization agents within the German Reich; by 30 November 1938, the network comprised 62 general reporting agents and 28 mobilization agents. Cross-border intelligence operations utilized local border-crossing permits (karty cyrkulacyjne) and cooperation with local cross-border smuggling networks.

Under Szpądrowski's direction, Station No. 4 conducted several major operations:

- Operation "Per-Pethe" (late 1935): an operational deception game that identified the personnel roster and investigative methods of the Gestapo post in Bytom (Beuthen);
- In September 1937, the station produced a 1:300,000 scale intelligence map of the border zone plotting German screening forces and assembly areas for potential mobilization;
- Identified German fortification construction directorates, newly constructed bunkers southeast of Nowa Sól (Neusalz), and defensive earthworks east of Frankfurt (Oder);
- During the autumn 1938 Sudetenland crisis, tracked the redeployment of the German VIII Army Corps back to Silesian garrisons, acquiring Wehrmacht mobilization cards and decoding military cover addresses;
- Identified wartime emergency telephone switchboards constructed in the basements of district administrative buildings, courts, and town halls across German Silesia.

On 10 November 1938, Szpądrowski was awarded the Gold Cross of Merit following a recommendation from Lieutenant Colonel Wilhelm Heinrich, Chief of Division IIa of the Second Department, who cited his dedication exceeding standard duty requirements and characterized him as a systematic and demanding commander.

Szpądrowski's defense of his intelligence assessments led in 1937–1938 to friction with the Chief of the General Staff, Brigadier General Wacław Stachiewicz. In his reports, Szpądrowski consistently warned headquarters of the scale of the German military threat, which Stachiewicz regarded as "excessively open criticism" of superior officers and their operational estimates. Refusing to modify his assessments, Szpądrowski was recalled from Katowice and handed over command of Station No. 4 in January 1939 to his successor, Major Stanisław Kuniczak. Effective 1 February 1939, he was transferred in a disciplinary reassignment to command the III Battalion of the 6th Heavy Artillery Regiment in Lwów.

== World War II and the defense of Lwów ==
In late August 1939, Szpądrowski was assigned to intelligence duties in the newly mobilized Kraków Army, and on 28 August 1939 was appointed head of the intelligence section of Operational Group "Silesia" (Grupa Operacyjna „Śląsk”). On 3 September 1939, following the death in action of Lieutenant Colonel Marian Zdon, he assumed the post of Chief of Intelligence (Second Department of the Staff) of Kraków Army.

On 13 September 1939, Szpądrowski was dispatched from the army headquarters in Zamość to Lwów with orders to establish liaison with General Kazimierz Sosnkowski, commander of the Southern Front, and collect new operational maps and cipher tables. Cut off from Kraków Army by advancing German armored and motorized columns, he took part in the defense of Lwów under Brigadier General Władysław Langner. Following the capitulation of the city to the Red Army on 22 September 1939, in compliance with the orders of the garrison command, he reported to the Lwów Citadel, where he was taken into Soviet captivity.

== Soviet captivity, interrogation, and execution ==
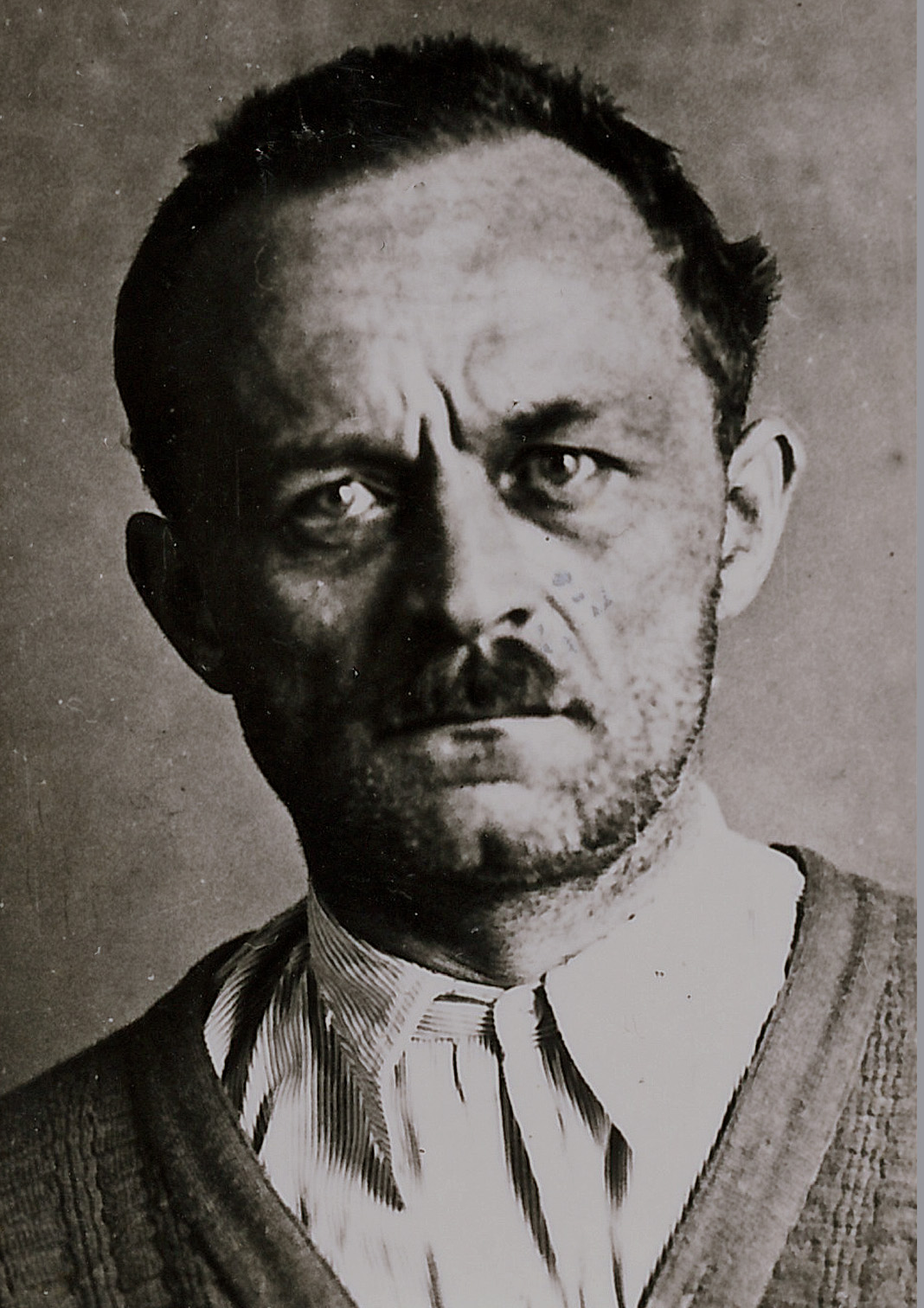
NKVD prison photograph of Major Kazimierz Szpądrowski in Moscow (1940)

Szpądrowski was interned in the Starobilsk camp, which was confirmed by correspondence received by his family in December 1939; at the end of January 1940, the last letter sent to him was returned with an annotation that the addressee had left the camp. He was later listed among the prisoners missing in the USSR in the post-war Katyn registers compiled by Adam Moszyński and Andrzej Leszek Szcześniak.

In January 1940, the NKVD at Starobilsk identified Szpądrowski as an officer of the Second Department of the General Staff, resulting in his separation from the general prisoner contingent and transfer to Lefortovo Prison in Moscow. He was formally arrested on 26 July 1940. Between 7 February and 18 October 1940, Soviet state security investigators subjected him to nine interrogations aimed at uncovering the structure, agent networks, and operational methods of Polish military intelligence. Surviving transcripts record that Szpądrowski confined his answers to his official military biography and family background, refusing to answer any questions concerning intelligence operations.

During his second interrogation on 10 February 1940, Szpądrowski stated:

The oath I took does not permit me to answer questions regarding matters that constitute secrets of the Second Department... I will answer only those questions that have no connection to the work of the Second Department and are not secret... I cannot provide names.

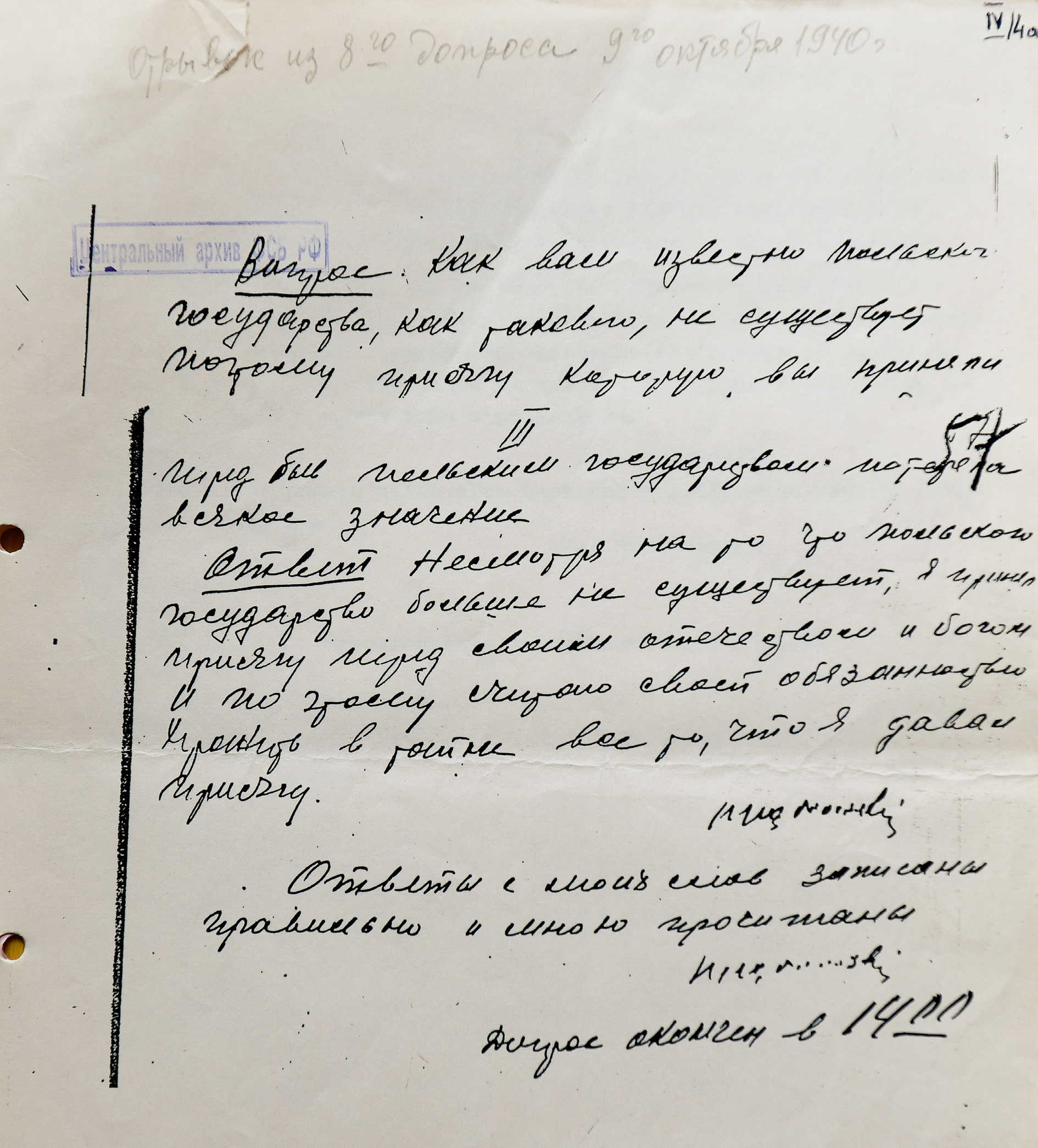
Excerpt from the 9 October 1940 interrogation protocol bearing Szpądrowski's signature

During his eighth interrogation on 9 October 1940, when the investigator argued that his military oath was no longer binding because the Polish state had ceased to exist, Szpądrowski replied:

Regardless of the fact that the Polish State has ceased to exist, I took an oath to my Fatherland and to God, and under all circumstances I consider it my duty to keep secret everything contained in that oath.

During his final questioning on 18 October 1940, he rejected all charges of anti-Soviet espionage:

I did not engage in intelligence work to the detriment of the USSR and I do not plead guilty.

On 23 October 1940, the NKVD issued a formal indictment charging him under Articles 58-4 ("assisting the international bourgeoisie") and 58-6 ("espionage") of the Criminal Code of the Russian SFSR. On 20 November 1940, the Military Collegium of the Supreme Court of the Soviet Union tried Szpądrowski in a closed session held without defense counsel or prosecution. In his final statement to the court, Szpądrowski maintained:

I do not feel guilty, because I acted for the good of my State. I joined intelligence service on the orders of my superiors. I did not engage in activity detrimental to the Soviet Union. Service in Polish intelligence performed by me caused no harm to the Soviet Union.

The Military Collegium sentenced him to death by firing squad on the same day. A petition for clemency was rejected on 21 December 1940, and the sentence was carried out in Moscow on 25 December 1940. His body was cremated, and his ashes were interred in unmarked Mass Grave No. 1 at the Donskoye Cemetery in Moscow.

== Rehabilitation and commemoration ==
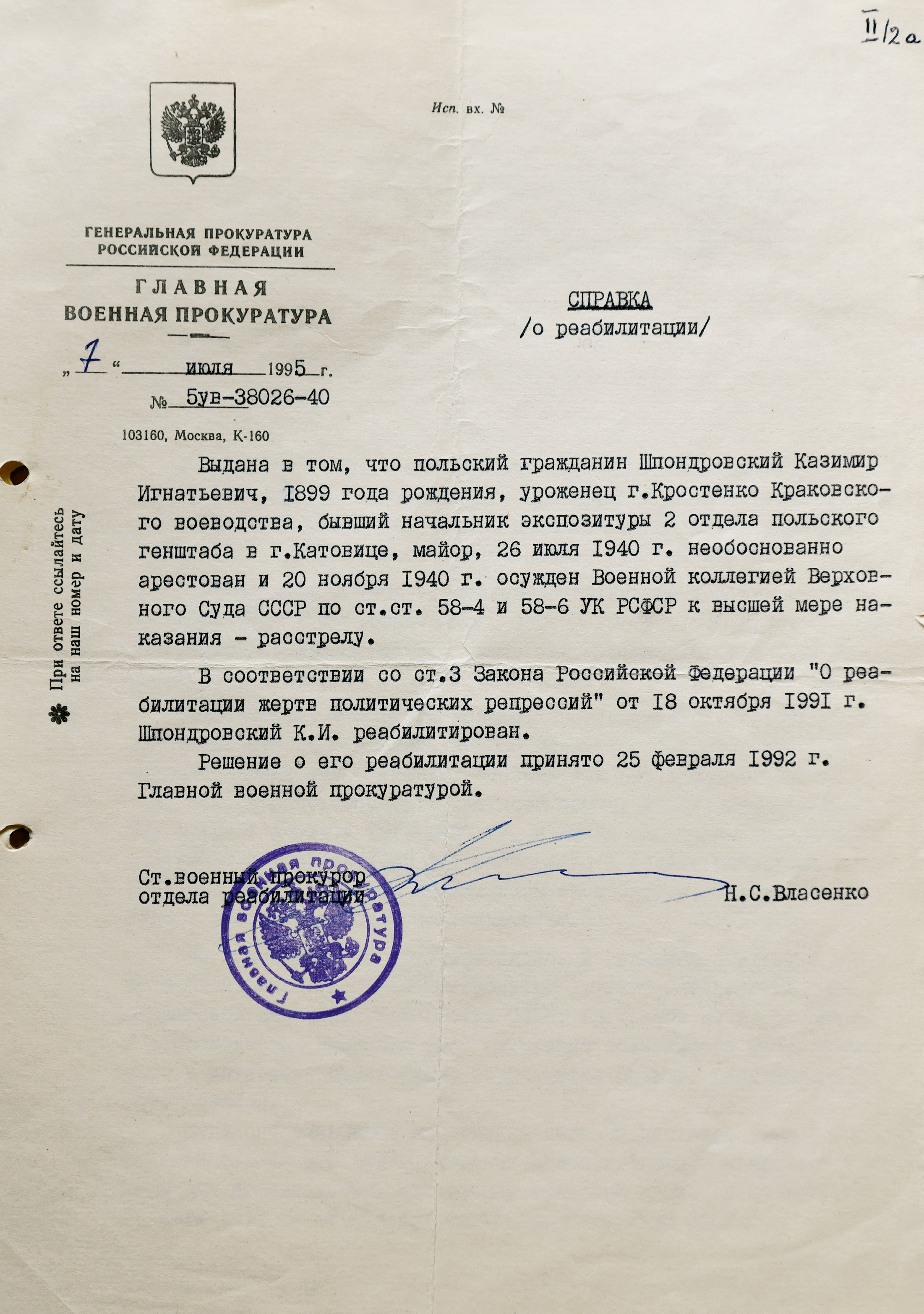
Certificate of rehabilitation issued by the Russian Federation (1992)

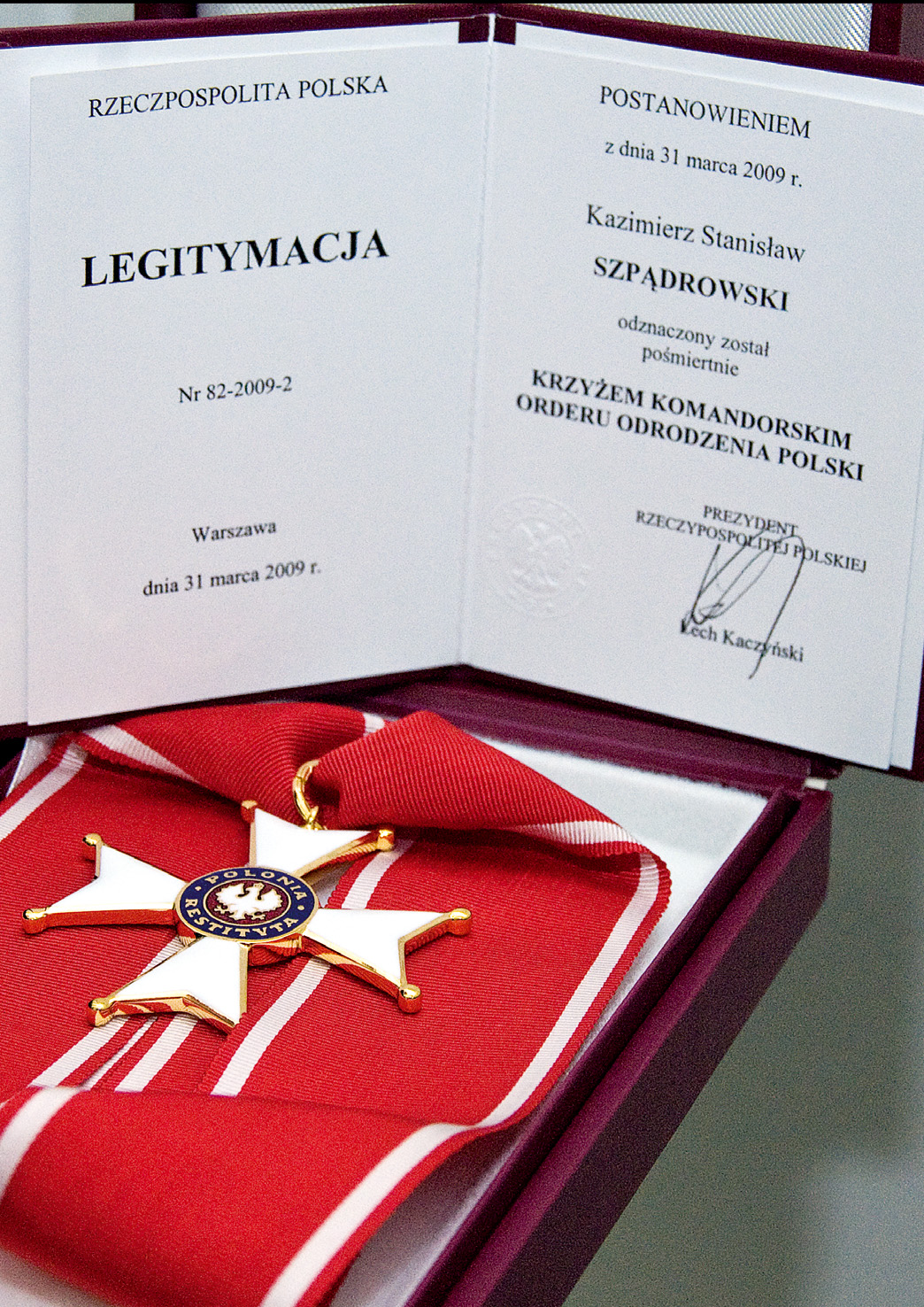
Commander's Cross of the Order of Polonia Restituta presented to the family (2009)

On 25 February 1992, the Chief Military Prosecutor's Office of the Russian Federation formally rehabilitated Szpądrowski, confirming the absence of any criminal offense in his conduct and establishing that he had acted in accordance with his official military duties in the interest of the Polish state. On 28 May 1996, the Moscow daily newspaper Vechernyaya Moskva published his name in the official register of persons executed in Moscow during the Stalinist purges and buried at Donskoye Cemetery.

On 27 July 1998, Polish Minister of National Defence Janusz Onyszkiewicz posthumously promoted Szpądrowski to the rank of lieutenant colonel. On 31 March 2009, President of Poland Lech Kaczyński posthumously awarded him the Commander's Cross of the Order of Polonia Restituta "for outstanding services to the independence of the Republic of Poland". The insignia was presented to his family on 23 October 2009 at the Belweder in Warsaw.

Szpądrowski is commemorated on memorial plaques dedicated to the victims of Stalinist crimes at St. Charles Borromeo Church at Powązki Cemetery in Warsaw, at Kule Cemetery in Częstochowa, and at the Marcin Wadowita High School in Wadowice.

== Military ranks ==
Rank	Date of rank	Seniority	Citation
Warrant officer	6 November 1918	—	
Second lieutenant	16 January 1919	6 January 1919	
Lieutenant	1 June 1919	1 June 1919 (verified 3 May 1922; rank 609)	
Captain	1 January 1928	1 January 1928 (rank 42)	
Major	19 March 1937	19 March 1937	
Lieutenant colonel	27 July 1998 (posthumous)	—	

== Honours and awards ==
- Commander's Cross of the Order of Polonia Restituta (posthumous, 31 March 2009)
- Cross of Valour (1921)
- Gold Cross of Merit (10 November 1938)
- Medal of Independence
- Silver Cross of Merit (1930)
- Commemorative Medal for the War of 1918–1921
- Medal of the Decade of Regained Independence
- Bronze Medal for Long Service (1938)
- September Campaign Cross (posthumous, 15 August 1985)
