= PZL.46 Sum =

Polish war plane

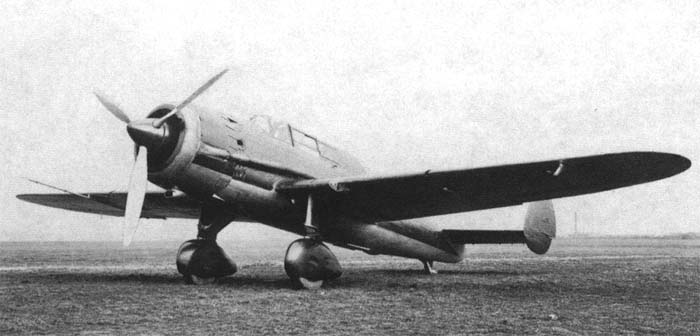
- First prototype of the PZL.46

General information
- Type: Light bomber and reconnaissance aircraft
- Manufacturer: Państwowe Zakłady Lotnicze
- Primary user: Polish Military Aviation
- Number built: 2 prototypes

History
- Manufactured: 1939
- First flight: August 1938

PZL.46 Sum (sheatfish) was a light bomber developed by Państwowe Zakłady Lotnicze shortly before World War II, which, was directed to serial production in the spring of 1939. These planes were in production, but the Polish industry did not manage to produce them before the outbreak of the war.

== Design and development ==
The PZL.46 Sum was designed by Stanisław Prauss in the PZL works as a successor to the standard Polish light bomber and reconnaissance plane, the PZL.23 Karaś, also of Prauss' design. First sketches were made in 1936. In order to test new features, like double tail fins and a retractable underbelly bombardier gondola, a single modified PZL.23, designated PZL.42 was built and tested in 1936.

The first prototype of PZL.46 Sum flew in August 1938. It shared only a general composition with PZL.23, its fuselage was much more aerodynamically refined and its wings had thinner profile. Initially it was intended to use retractable landing gear, but since the Polish industry did not produce retractable landing gear, a fixed one was used. In November–December 1938 the prototype was shown at the Paris Air Show. In May 1939 the second similar prototype was flown (PZL.46/II).

Tests proved, that the Sum was a successful design, with much better performance, than PZL.23. The only major faults were with a mechanism of retracting of the underbelly gondola (the gondola for a bombardier, with a machine gun at the rear, was a feature copied from PZL.23, where it was a fixed one. It was a rare feature in light bombers' construction and its usefulness was questionable, as it reduced performance).

In March 1939 the PZL.46 was ordered for a serial production. The Polish Air Force planned to buy 160 aircraft of the PZL.46A variant. The first aircraft were to be completed in autumn 1939 and delivered in early 1940. Only some parts were produced by the German invasion of Poland in September 1939.

The third prototype was in construction in the summer of 1939, it was to be an export variant PZL.46B, powered with Gnome-Rhône 14N21 engine. Bulgaria, using PZL.43 bombers, showed an interest in the new design and made a preliminary order for 12 aircraft, uncompleted due to war.

Stanisław Prauss made also a preliminary design of smaller development variant PZL Łosoś, which was to be a two-seater dive bomber with 1,600 hp (1,200 kW) Hispano-Suiza 12Z inline engine and retractable landing gear, without underbelly gondola.

=== Technical description ===
The aircraft was conventional in layout, mid-wing all-metal cantilever monoplane, metal-covered. The fuselage was semi-monocoque, oval in cross-section. Double tail fins. The crew consisted of three: pilot, observer/bombardier and rear gunner. The bombardier's combat station was in a gondola underneath the fuselage, where he also operated an underbelly machine gun. The gondola could be retracted into the fuselage to decrease drag. The fixed undercarriage had aerodynamic teardrop covers. Radial engine, PZL-built 840 hp Bristol Pegasus (PZL Pegaz) XXB (maximum power 940 hp), in a NACA-style cowling. Three-blade metal propeller Hamilton Standard. Fuel tanks: 750 L in a central wing section.

== Operational history ==
During World War II, the first prototype was left in Warsaw, because of a landing gear damage. On 5 September 1939 the second prototype was evacuated from Warsaw to Lwów, then on 17 September to Bucharest in Romania, where it was interned. On 26 September 1939, under pretext of delivering the plane to IAR factory in Brasov, it was flown by Riess with other three crewmen (including Witold Urbanowicz) from Romania to besieged Warsaw. The crew delivered orders from the Polish commander in chief marshal Edward Rydz-Śmigły for the commander of Warsaw defence Juliusz Rómmel. On 27 September 1939, piloted by Riess and carrying staff courier Lieutenant Colonel Karol Piasecki with command dispatches, it flew to Kaunas in Lithuania. The plane was interned and left there and later captured there and tested by the Soviets.

== Variants ==
PZL.46/I
First prototype.
PZL.46/II
Second prototype.
PZL.46A
Main production version, 160 ordered for Polish Military Aviation, none delivered.
PZL.46B
Export version powered Gnome-Rhône 14N21 engine.

== Operators ==
Bulgaria

- Bulgarian Air Force preliminarily ordered 12 aircraft, none delivered.

Poland

- Polish Military Aviation

Soviet Union

- Soviet Air Force operated one captured prototype for evaluation.

== Specifications (PZL.46/I) ==

Data from

General characteristics

- Crew: 3
- Length: 10.5 m (34 ft 5 in)
- Wingspan: 14.6 m (47 ft 11 in)
- Height: 3.3 m (10 ft 10 in)
- Wing area: 27 m^{2} (290 sq ft)
- Empty weight: 1,995 kg (4,398 lb)
- Gross weight: 3,550 kg (7,826 lb)
- Powerplant: 1 × PZL Pegaz XXB 9-cylinder air-cooled radial piston engine, 685 kW (918 hp) maximum power (short duration) Sum A

1,030 hp (768 kW) Gnome-Rhône 14N-21 Sum B

- Propellers: 3-bladed Hamilton/PZL variable-pitch propeller

Performance

- Maximum speed: 425 km/h (264 mph, 229 kn) at 3,600 m (11,811 ft) Sum A

350 km/h (220 mph; 190 kn) at sea level Sum A
470 km/h (290 mph; 250 kn) at 4,700 m (15,420 ft) Sum B
370 km/h (230 mph; 200 kn) at sea level Sum B

- Stall speed: 110 km/h (68 mph, 59 kn)
- Range: 1,300 km (810 mi, 700 nmi) ::::1,100 km (684 mi; 594 nmi) Sum B
- Service ceiling: 7,700 m (25,300 ft) ::::8,600 m (28,215 ft) Sum B
- Rate of climb: 6 m/s (1,200 ft/min)
- Wing loading: 131.1 kg/m^{2} (26.9 lb/sq ft)
- Power/mass: 0.196 kW/kg (0.119 hp/lb)

Armament

- Guns: 8 x machine guns:

- 2 x 7.92 mm karabin lotniczy uniwersalny wz. 36 fixed in nose with synchronising gear;
- 2 x 7.92 mm karabin lotniczy uniwersalny wz. 36 fixed in wings;
- 1 x 7.92 mm karabin lotniczy obserwatora wz. 37 in rear upper station (production planes were to have 2)
- 1 x 7.92 mm karabin lotniczy obserwatora wz. 37 in rear lower station;

- Bombs: 600 kg (1,323 lb) of bombs under wings.

== See also ==
Related development

- PZL.23 Karaś

Aircraft of comparable role, configuration, and era

- Heinkel He 70
- Fairey Battle
- A-35 Vengeance
- Mitsubishi Ki-30
- DAR-10
