= Sieradz National Defence Brigade =

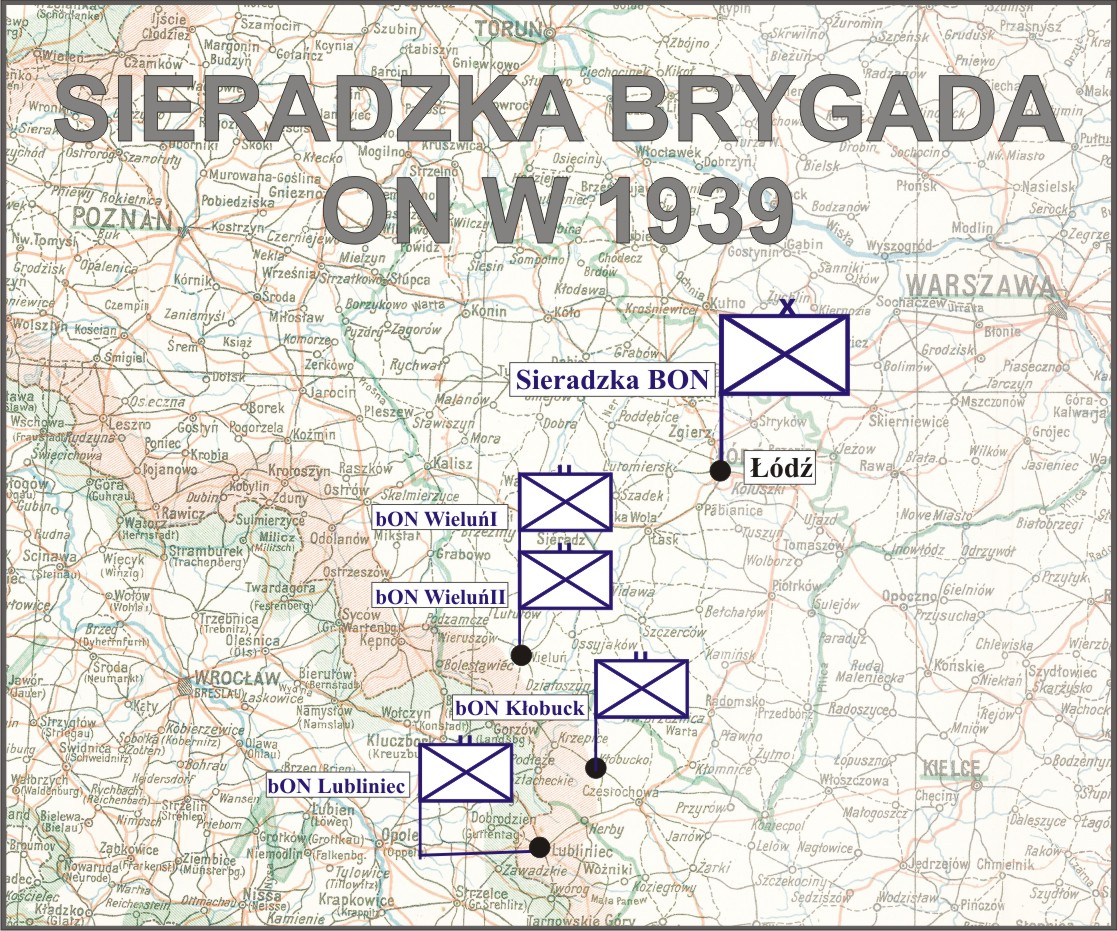
Sieradz Brigade of the National Defense Forces

The Sieradz National Defence Brigade (Polish: Sieradzka Brygada Obrony Narodowej) was a reserve unit of the Polish Army in the interbellum period. Stationed in Łódź, on August 30, 1939, it was moved to Wieluń. It consisted of several battalions, such as Wieluń I, Wieluń II, Kępno, Ostrzeszów, Lubliniec and Klobuck. Commanded by colonel Jerzy Grobicki, it was part of the Łódź Army and its battalions were divided between 7th and 10th Infantry Divisions.

== See also ==
- Polish army order of battle in 1939
- Polish contribution to World War II
