= Juliusz Rómmel =

Polish general (1881–1967)

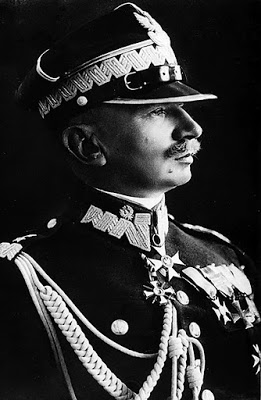
- Born: 3 June 1881; Grodno, Russian Empire
- Died: 8 September 1967 (aged 86); Warsaw, Polish People's Republic
- Military career
- Allegiance: Russian Empire (1903–1917); Second Polish Republic (1918–1939); Polish People's Republic (1945–1967)
- Branch: Imperial Russian Army; Polish Armed Forces
- Service years: 1903–1947
- Rank: Major General
- Commands: Polish 1st Legions Infantry Division; 1st Cavalry Division; Łódź Army; Warszawa Army
- Conflicts: World War I; Russian Civil War; Polish–Soviet War; Battle of Komarów; Battle of the Niemen River; World War II; Battle of Łódź; Siege of Warsaw
- Awards: Order of the White Eagle Silver Cross of Virtuti Militari Commandrr's Cross of Polonia Restituta Cross of Valor Signum Laudis (Austria-Hungary) Legion of Honour (France) War Cross (Francja) Victory Medal

Juliusz Karol Wilhelm Józef Rómmel (German: Julius Karl Wilhelm Josef Freiherr von Rummel; 3 June 1881 – 8 September 1967) was a Polish military commander, a general of the Polish Armed Forces.

He graduated from the Corps of Cadets in Pskov and later from Кonstantin Artillery School at St. Petersburg. During World War I he served as a Russian Imperial army officer and fought in the 1st Guards Artillery Brigade. In 1917 he joined the Polish Army. During the Polish–Soviet War, he gained great fame for achieving a decisive victory in the Battle of Komarów, the largest cavalry engagement of the 20th century. A commander of two Polish armies during the invasion of Poland of 1939, Rómmel was one of the most controversial of the generals to serve during that conflict. After the invasion he was captured by German troops and interned in a POW camp in Murnau. After liberation by the Americans he returned to Poland to serve as Commander in Chief. After 1956 Rómmel worked in the Association of Fighters for Freedom and Democracy.

== Ancestry ==
Although the Rummel family felt Polish and spoke Polish at home, they were in fact heirs to one of the oldest German families in Central Europe, tracing its roots to a certain Matthias Heinrich Freiherr von Rummel, a Livonian Brother of the Sword who in 1332 owned the Getzingen castle near Jülich in Westphalia and settled in Courland to support the Teutonic Knights in their struggle against the pagan Balts.

== Early career and World War I ==
Juliusz Karol Wilhelm Józef Rómmel graduated from the Konstantin Artillery School in St. Petersburg in 1903. He served in the Imperial Russian Army under Tsar Nicholas II. In September 1903 he was appointed second lieutenant and in September 1909 vice-captain. He participated in the Russo-Japanese War between 1904 and 1905, for which he received the Medal of the Red Cross. He also attended the College of Physical Education.

During the Great War, he served as the commanding officer of the 1st Artillery Brigade. He was wounded twice: first time in October 1914 and in May 1915 near the town of Dęblin. In February 1915 he was promoted to the rank of captain and in July 1916 he became a colonel of the Tsar's army. After the February Revolution of 1917 he was elected as a delegate to the Congress of Polish Military in the South-Western Front and to the Congress of Polish Military in Petrograd. He later joined the Polish Army Corps in Minsk. From there he was sent to Kiev and Żytomierz as he was responsible for the formation of Polish troops in Eastern Europe. In 1917, he was transferred to the Polish II Corps being formed in the area of Ukraine and became one of its organizers. From January to early February 1918 on the order of General commander Eugene de Henning Michaelis, Rómmel was in charge of all Polish troops stationing in Kiev. During this period he formed a separate Artillery III Corps consisting of three batteries, which he later commanded in Central Europe. During the Russian Civil War, he commanded the Polish Light Brigade, a part of General Żeligowski's 4th Rifle Division. Interned by Austria-Hungary, in 1918 he joined the newly established Polish Army of the Second Polish Republic governed by its Chief of State, Marshal Józef Piłsudski.

== The Polish-Bolshevik War and interwar years ==
On 3 November 1918, he joined the Polish army and instantly became a colonel of the Armed Forces. With the help of his subordinates, he was responsible for the disarmament of the German troops in the city of Rembertów. He was then appointed commander of the artillery camp in Rembertów, and using the captured weapons (4 batteries of cannons) he organized and established the 8th Artillery Regiment. He attended the 3-week course at the Artillery Training Center in Warsaw. During the Polish-Soviet War between 1919 and 1920, he took part in the fighting in the Vilnius region and also was a participant in the Latvian offensive (during which his unit captured Daugavpils). From 17 June until 10 July 1920 he commanded the 1st Infantry Division of Legionów. Although initially a commanding officer of the 1st Legions Infantry Division he created and commanded the 1st Cavalry Division. In that post, he won a striking victory against Semyon Budyonny in the Battle of Komarów on 30 August 1920, in which Budyonny lost an estimated 4,000 men. Rómmel's victory in the largest cavalry battle in the 20th century later added to his popularity and fame in Poland. In September 1920 he also fought with distinction in the ranks of Haller's Operational Group of Sikorski's 3rd Army during the Battle of the Niemen River. After the war he published many books where he described his experiences before and following the battles in the east. From 28 February until 16 April 1921 he took part in an information exchange for senior commanders in Warsaw. On 22 June 1921 he was appointed inspector of Vilnius. On 3 May 1922 he was promoted to the rank of brigadier general on the order of Marshal Piłsudski. On 1 June 1924 he was appointed commander of the 1st Division of Cavalry based in Białystok. On 11 September 1926 he was assigned to duties in the General Inspectorate of the Armed Forces. In 1928 he was promoted to the rank of Major General. From 27 June 1929 until September 1939 he was an Army Inspector. Rómmel was an enthusiastic both political and military writer. He was the author of novels and published several newspaper articles about his past experiences about modern warfare.

== World War II and retirement ==
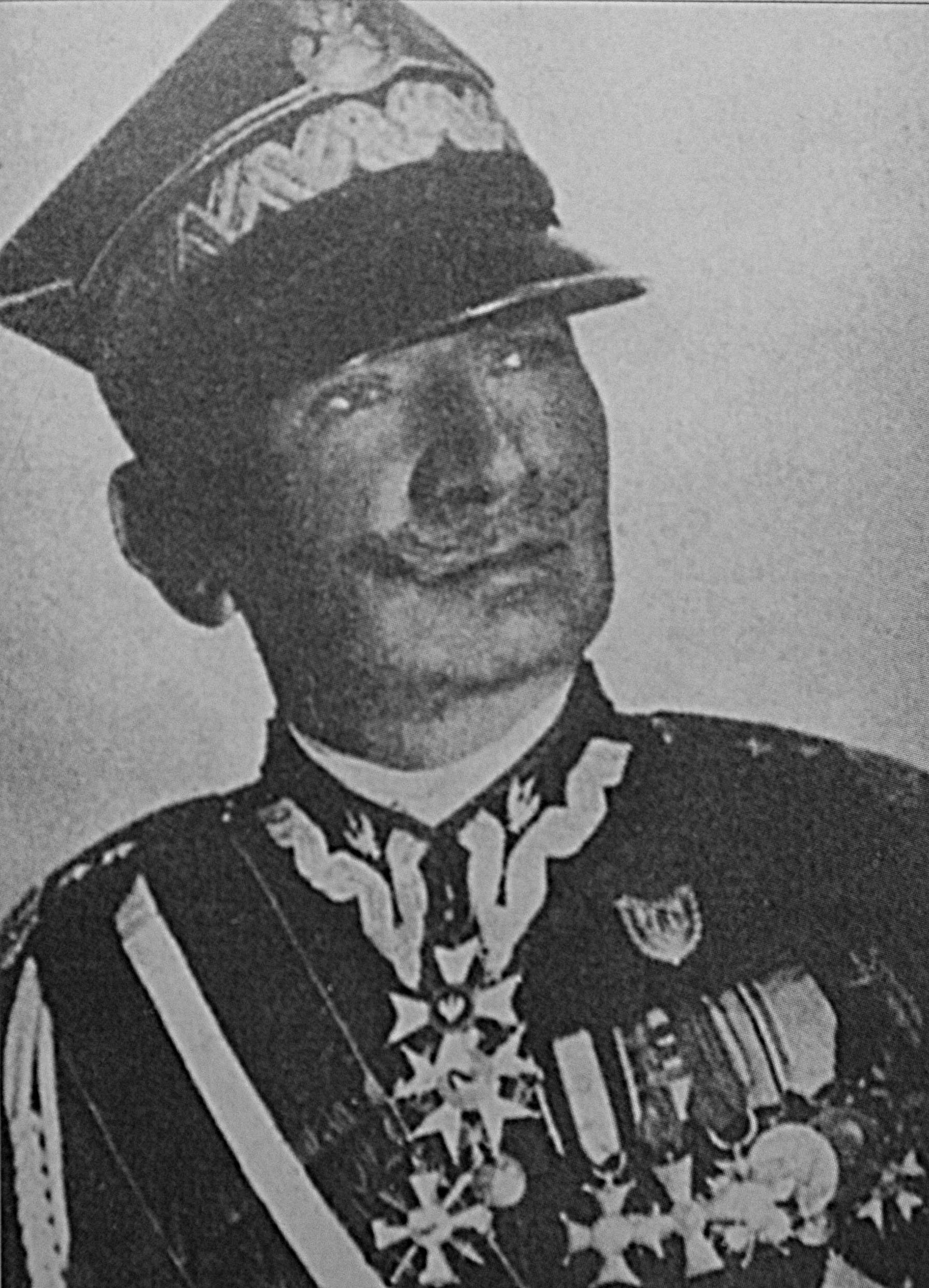
J. Rómmel

In March 1939, he was given command of the Łódź Army, a Polish tactical group that was to link the southern and northern flanks of the Polish Army during the probable war with Germany. He positioned his forces close to the border with Germany. When the Polish Defensive War finally broke out on 1 September 1939, this proved to be a fatal move. Without any natural defences, Rómmel's army was easily outmaneuvered and cut out from the rest of the Polish forces, without much chance to act as a pivot of the Polish defences or even withdraw. Under still uncertain circumstances, Rómmel and his staff were separated from his army and headed for Warsaw, arriving on the night of 7–8 September. The Commander-in-Chief, Edward Rydz-Śmigły, (then in Brześć), gave him command over all the Polish forces in the ad hoc Warsaw Army, which included the Warsaw Defense Force under General Walerian Czuma and the Modlin Fortress defense force under General Wiktor Thommée. Rydz-Śmigły gave him a signed order to "..defend the city as long as ammunition and food lasts, to hold as many of the enemy forces as possible." He signed all the proclamations to the civilian population. Before the surrender, Rómmel authorized Gen. Michał Karaszewicz-Tokarzewski to create the Służba Zwycięstwu Polski. On 27 September Rómmel started negotiations with Nazi Germany regarding the surrender of Warsaw. Rómmel allowed Michał Tokarzewski-Karaszewicz to engage in further battles and operations to maintain the independence and the integrity of the borders, which became the nucleus for the Polish underground organization.

He spent the rest of the war interned in German POW camps, among them Oflag IV-B Koenigstein, and the final years of the war in Oflag VII-A Murnau. Liberated by the US 12th Armored Division in April 1945, he was not welcome in the Polish II Corps and decided to return to Poland. Because of this, he was praised by communist propaganda as a war hero. He was also awarded with the Commander's Cross of Virtuti Militari.

In 1947, he retired from the army and spent the rest of his life writing books. His role during the September Campaign and after has been a subject of controversy.

== Personal life ==
According to Marshal Józef Piłsudski, Rómmel was a "vigorous and pious man, with a strong character and also very distinguished. He was a good type of soldier, fit for the further development of innate abilities and ideal for protecting his own military units." 46 years later, former chief of staff Aleksander Pragłowski wrote that "Although skilled and talented, Rómmel was full of surprises. It was shocking that he didn't make an effort to aid the Poznań Army or at least keep Warsaw free from Nazi slaughter for another month."

After 1956 Rómmel became active in the ZBoWiD and was appointed a member of the Supreme Council. He took part in carrying out the verification of degrees and awards given to soldiers and officers in the year. He belonged to the Committee for the Reconstruction of the Garrison Church on Puławska Street in Warsaw. Rómmel left 9 volumes of Memoirs dating from as early as 1881 to 1939, which are currently located in the Department of National Archives in Wrocław. But his military collection dating from the sixteenth to the twentieth century was given, in 1968 by his wife Janina, to the National Museum in Warsaw.

Juliusz Rómmel died on 8 September 1967 in a military hospital and was buried in the (former Military) Powązki Cemetery in Warsaw. He was, among others, awarded with Order of Virtuti Militari, Commander's Cross, Order of Polonia Restituta Commander's Cross with Star, Order of the Cross of Grunwald II class, Cross of Valour, Gold Cross of Merit, Grand officier de la Légion d'honneur and Order of Lāčplēsis II class.

Rómmel was married three times: from 1905 until 1932 to Maria Zofia Gobert, then to Irena Elwira Dębska until 1947, and finally to Janina Puchała-Puchalska (1911-1973). From his first marriage he had a son, Wiktor (1908-1970), who was an officer in the Polish People's Army.

== Honours and awards ==
Order of the Virtuti Militari, Commander's Cross
Order of the Virtuti Militari, Golden Cross
Order of the Virtuti Militari, Silver Cross
Order of Polonia Restituta, Commander's Cross with Star
Order of Polonia Restituta, Commander's Cross
Order of the Cross of Grunwald II class
Cross of Valour, IV award
Cross of Valour, I award
Gold Cross of Merit
Grand officier de la Légion d'honneur
Commandeur de la Légion d'honneur
Chevalier de la Légion d'honneur
Order of Lāčplēsis II class

== Relatives ==
His brother Karol Rómmel was also an officer of the Polish Army and a bronze medalist in equestrian eventing team at the 1928 Summer Olympics in Amsterdam.

== Bibliography ==
=== in English ===
- Eger, Christopher (16 October 2007), The Combat Record of the Konarmia: The Soviet Red Army's Cavalry 1918-1923
- Lerski, Jerzy Jan (a.k.a George J.) (1996), Historical Dictionary of Poland, 966-1945 (1st ed.), Westport, US-CT: Greenwood Press, p. 515, ISBN 0-313-26007-9
- LoneSentry (2004), Speed is the Password: The Story of the 12th Armored Division, LoneSentry.com
- Seidner, Stanley S. (1978), Marshal Edward Śmigły-Rydz: Rydz and the Defense of Poland, New York

=== in Polish ===
- Bartoszewski, Władysław (1984), 1859 dni Warszawy (English: 1859 days in Warsaw) (2nd ed.), Warszawa: Znak, ISBN 83-7006-152-4
- Kryska-Karski, Tadeusz; Żurakowski, Stanisław (1991) [London, Nakładem autorów, 1976], Generałowie Polski niepodległej (English: Generals of Polish Independence), Warszawa: Editions Spotkania, OCLC 24935744
- Rómmel, Juliusz (1958), Za honor i ojczyznę. Wspomnienia dowódcy armii "Łódź" i "Warszawa" (English: For Honor and Fatherland. Memories of the Commander of Armies "Łódź" and "Warsaw"), Warszawa: Wydawnictwo Iskry
- Stańczyk, Henryk (2004), Warszawa we wrześniu 1939 roku (English: Warsaw in September 1939), Warszawa: Rytm
- Wieczorkiewicz, Paweł Piotr (2001), Kampania 1939 roku (English: Military Campaign in 1939), Warszawa: KAW, ISBN 83-88072-53-6
- Biography Archived 2007-05-27 at the Wayback Machine
- Biography of Gen Rómmel

=== in Russian ===
- фон Руммель Юлий-Карл (Юлиуш Кароль Вильгельм Йозеф) Альфонсович, Русская армия в Первой мировой войне
