= Łódź Army =

1939 Polish Army formation

- Armia „Łódź”
- Active: 1939
- Country: Poland
- Branch: Army
- Part of: Supreme Command of the Polish Armed Forces
- Engagements: September Campaign

Commanders
- First commander: Maj. Gen. Juliusz Rómmel
- Last commander: Brig. Gen. Wiktor Thommée

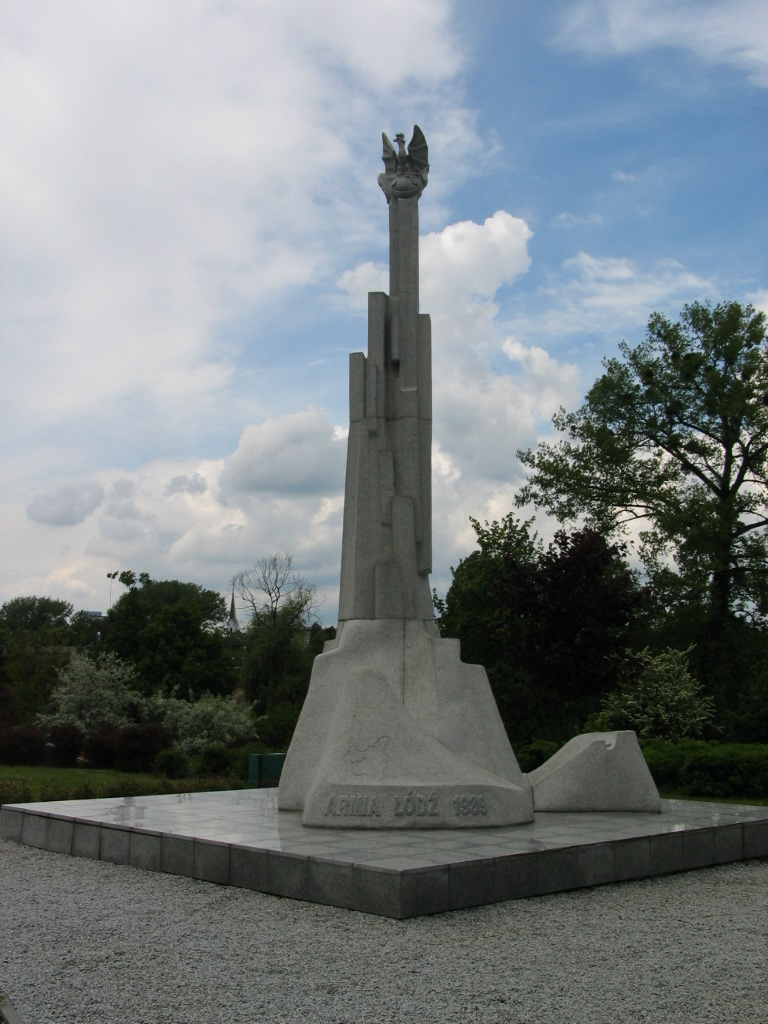
Monument to Łódź Army in Park Helenów in Łódź

Łódź Army (Polish: Armia Łódź) was one of the Polish armies of the Polish Armed Forces of the Second Polish Republic that took part in the Polish Defensive War of 1939. It was officially created on 23 March 1939 with the task of filling the gap between Poznań Army in the north and Kraków Army in the south. Commanded by Juliusz Rómmel, it consisted of five infantry divisions and two cavalry brigades with support from the air force.

== Tasks ==
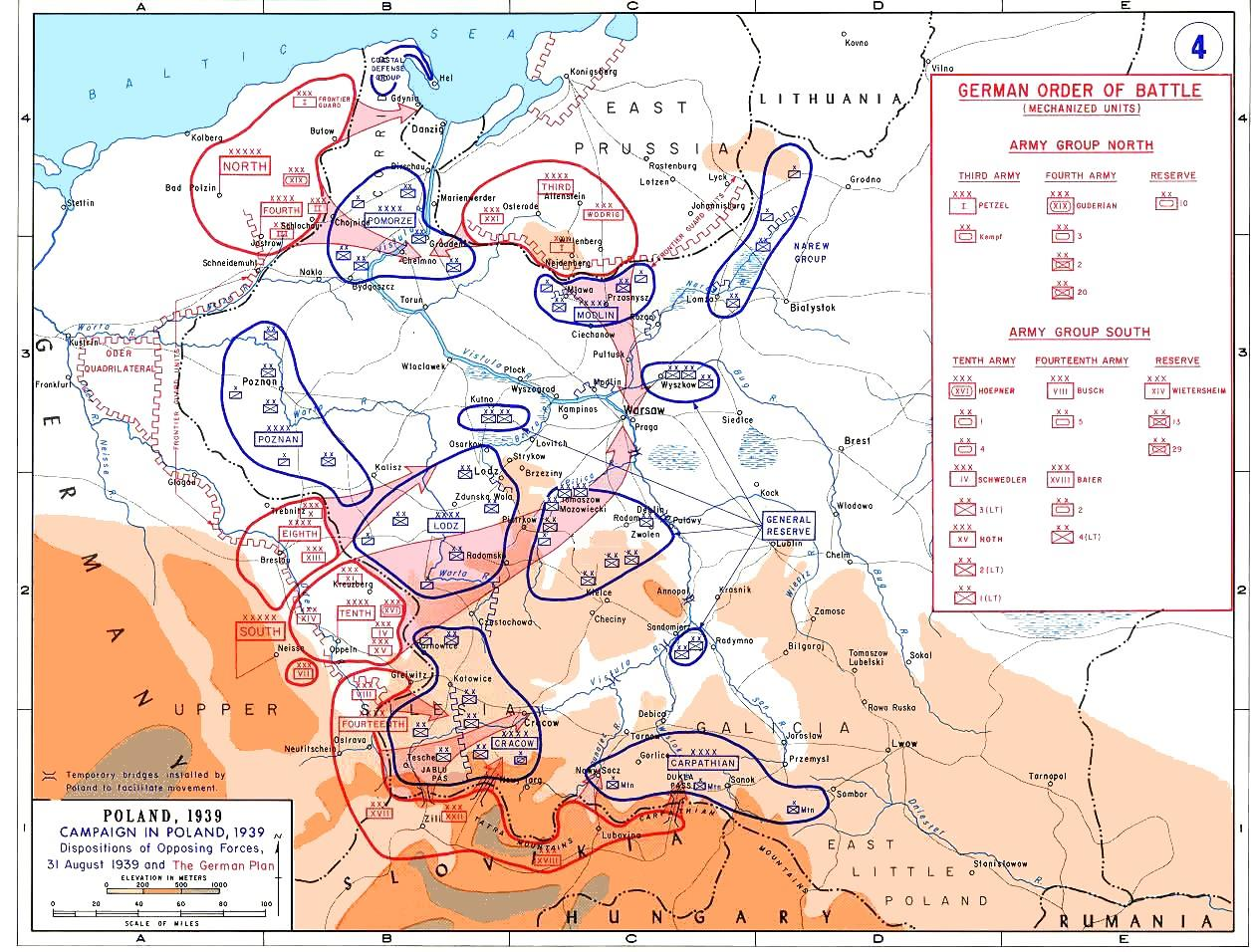
Forces as of 31 August and German plan of attack.

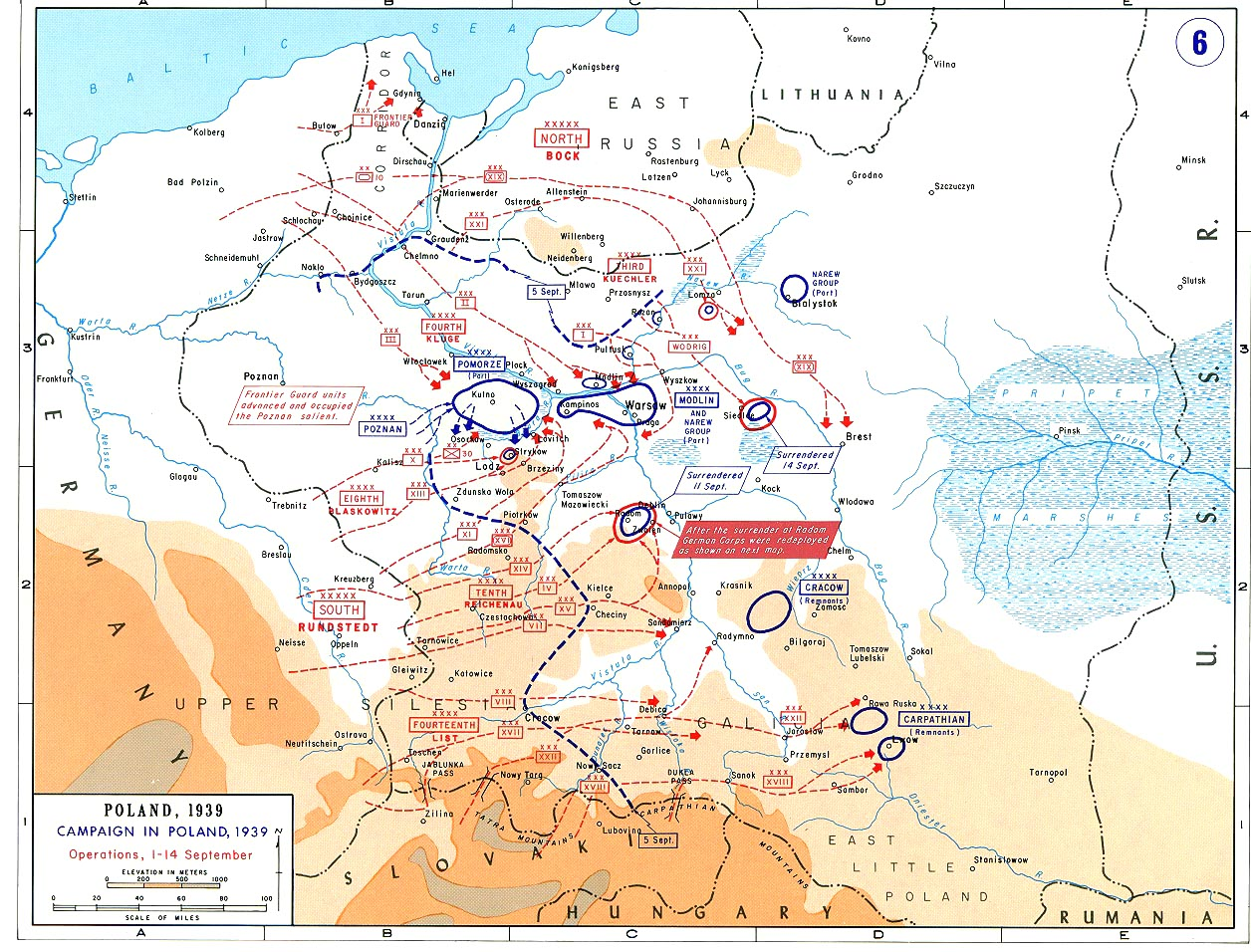
Forces as of 14 September with troop movements up to this date.

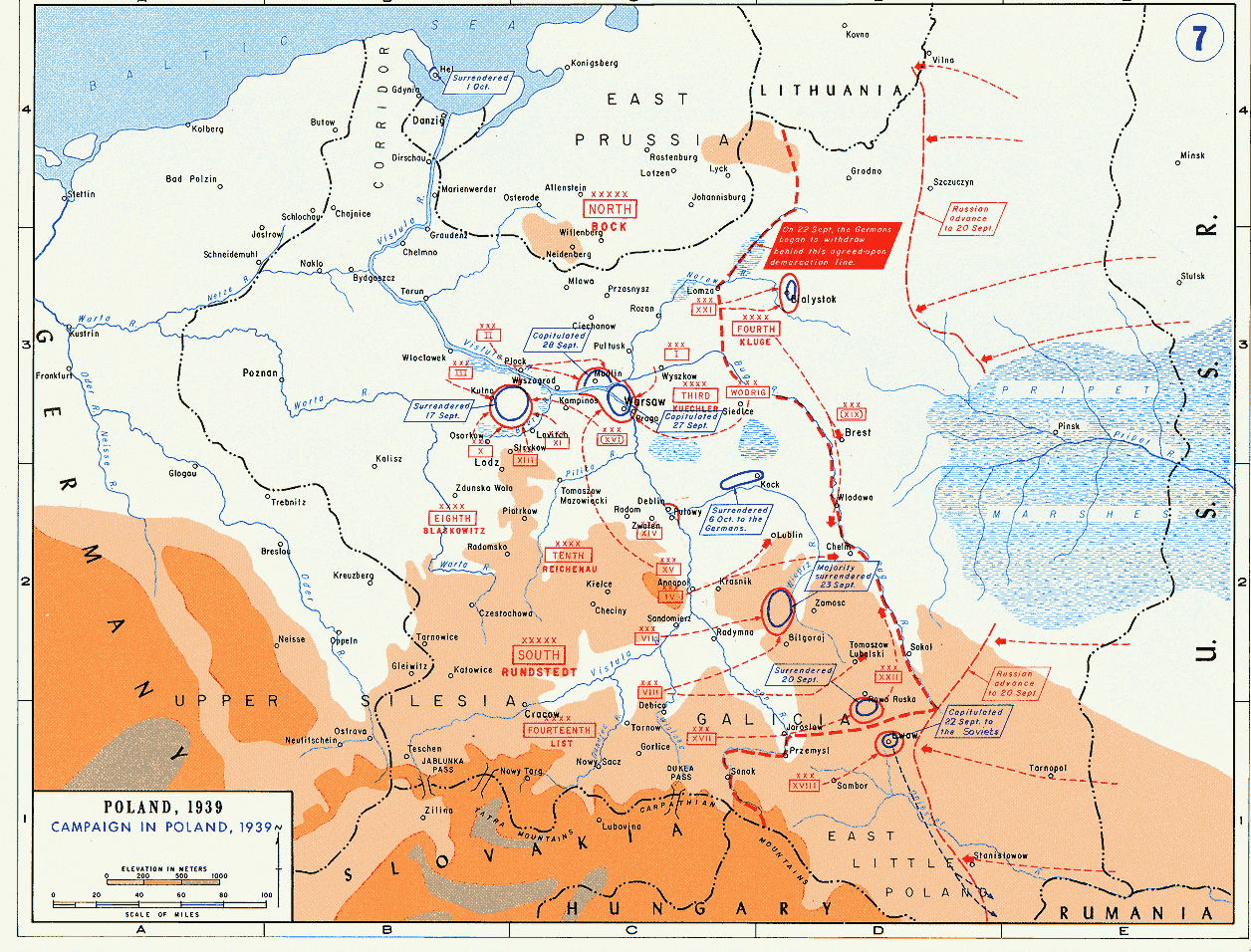
Forces after 14 September with troop movements after this date

The army's task was to fill the gap between Poznań Army in the north (defending Greater Poland under general Tadeusz Kutrzeba) and Kraków Army in the south (operating in Silesia and Lesser Poland under general Antoni Szylling), prevent enemy attacks in the direction of Łódź and Piotrków Trybunalski and if possible, advance towards Sieradz. It was also to cover the mobilization of a reserve Prusy Army behind the Polish lines. Because of that, the main strategic purpose of the army was to gain time and offer delaying actions and strong resistance on the expected main German offensive line (Częstochowa-Łódź-Warsaw) in order for the mobilization to be accomplished.

== Operational history ==
Despite several early successes, such as the Battle of Mokra on 1 September, where the Volhynian Cavalry Brigade stopped the German 4th Panzer Division, the army was forced to withdraw towards the Vistula River under increasing German pressure. The German Army Group South under Gerd von Rundstedt struck along the lines, dividing Łódź Army from Poznań Army and Kraków Army. Without any natural defences, and facing a significant enemy force while lacking support, Rómmel's army was easily outmanoeuvred and cut off from the rest of the Polish forces during the remainder of the Battle of the Border, with most of its units being outflanked by the German Eighth Army and the German Tenth Army. Łódź was taken by the Germans on 8 September. By the beginning of the second week of fighting, Army Łódź had suffered heavy casualties and failed in its task of defending its part of the Polish border.

General Rómmel advanced with a small contingent of forces towards Warsaw, where he assumed command of the improvised Warsaw Army tasked with defending the Polish capital (see siege of Warsaw), but he left most of his forces behind. General Wiktor Thommée assumed command of the remaining units. Piotrków Group, or as it became known after its commander, Thommée's Group, was much more successful, managing to avoid encirclement, and after the Battle of Wola Cyrusowa (September 8) his corps' last battle was the defence of the Modlin fortress (capitulated on 29 September).

== Organization ==
Army's commander was general Juliusz Rómmel. His chief of staff was colonel Aleksander Pragłowski. The Army also contained an Operational Group 'Piotrków' under general Wiktor Thommée.

Łódź Army	Unit	Polish name	Commander	Remarks
Army units - gen. Juliusz Rómmel*
	2nd Legions Infantry Division	2. Dywizja Piechoty Legionów	col. Edward Dojan-Surówka	in reserve, in combat from 2 September
	10th Infantry Division	10. Dywizja Piechoty	gen. bryg. Franciszek Józef Dindorf-Ankowicz
	22nd Mountain Infantry Division	22. Dywizja Piechoty Górskiej	col. Leopold Engel-Ragis	in theory reserve of Łódź Army, in practice delays made it unavailable on that part of the front (part of Karpaty Army till 2 September, Kraków Army afterwards
	28th Infantry Division	28. Dywizja Piechoty	gen. bryg. Władysław Bończa-Uzdowski
	Kresy Cavalry Brigade	Kresowa Brygada Kawalerii	col. Stefan Hanka-Kulesza	in reserve, in combat from 2 September
	Sieradz National Defence Brigade	Sieradzka Brygada Obrony Narodowej
Piotrków Operational Group - gen. Wiktor Thommée
	Wołyńska Cavalry Brigade	Wołyńska Brygada Kawalerii	col. Julian Filipowicz
	30th Infantry Division	30. Dywizja Piechoty	gen.bryg. Leopold Cehak
Army's Airforce - col.Wacław Iwaszkiewicz
	Pluton Łącznikowy nr 10; 32. Eskadra Rozpoznawcza; III/6. Dywizjon Myśliwski; 63. Eskadra Obserwacyjna; 66. Eskadra Obserwacyjna

The Army also had smaller notable units, such as two armoured trains (no.52 and no.53).
