= Battle of Łódź (1939) =

Battle during the German Invasion of Poland

- Part of Invasion of Poland
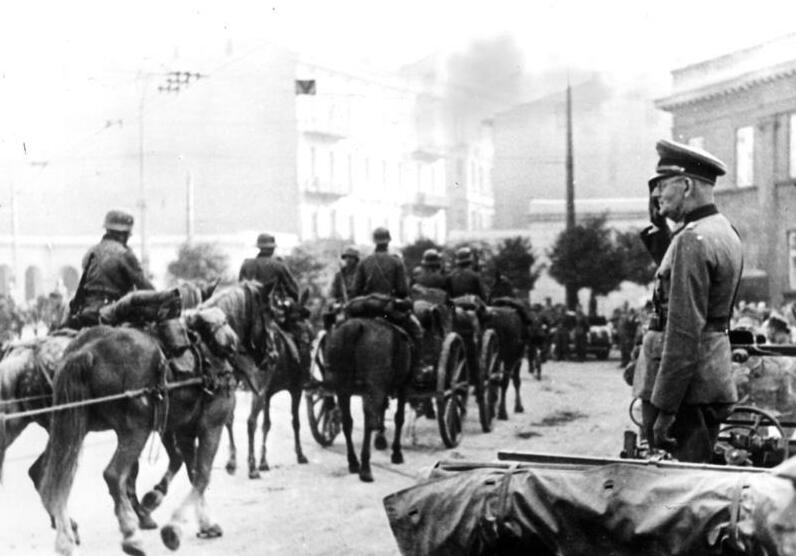
- German troops in Łódź
Date	September 6–8, 1939
Location	Łódź, Łódź Voivodeship, Poland
Result	German victory

Belligerents
Germany	Poland

Commanders and leaders
(Nazi Germany) Gerd von Rundstedt	(Second Polish Republic) Juliusz Rómmel

Strength
Unknown	Unknown

Casualties and losses
Unknown	Unknown

The Battle of Łódź was fought on September 6–8, 1939, between the armies of Poland and Nazi Germany in World War II during the Invasion of Poland. The Polish forces were led by General Juliusz Rómmel.

== Prelude ==
The German aggression was anticipated by the Poles from the spring of 1939, when Poland refused to join the Axis against the Soviet Union (see Polish Soviet War of 1919-1920). Poland’s strategy during the forecasted war would be to withstand the initial German attack and trigger France and Great Britain to declare war on Germany, and, afterwards, to execute a fighting retreat to the Romanian Bridgehead. Polish General Juliusz Rómmel was given command of the Łódź Army and to buy time to finish the mobilization of his own army, he led three divisions in the direction of the border. He believed that only through mobility and continuous resistance ("fighting for every village"), the German advance could be slowed enough to finish mobilization of his own army. The headquarters of the army were in the city of Łódź. The reason for the late mobilization was pressure from the French and the British not to mobilize. As of 29 August 1939, the Poles restarted the mobilization against advice from Paris and London (see Jabłonków Incident, 25 August 1939).

== The taking of Łódź ==
After the initial ambushes worked (Battle of Mokra), the Germans gained momentum and easily defeated the rear units of the Łódź Army (still in the process of mobilization). Łódź had fallen. The three divisions sent to the border were cut off and ceased to exist. This created a domino effect. Because Łódź had fallen, the victorious tank brigade and the supporting infantry soldiers had to withdraw from Piotrkow Trybunalski. This exposed the flank of the Kraków Army and they and the fully mechanized 10th Cavalry Brigade of Stanisław Maczek had to head towards Lwów. This withdrawal from southwestern Poland in turn forced a withdrawal from northern Poland and left units under the de facto command of General Kutrzeba (Battle of Bzura river) stranded west of the Vistula river. Even the units that did successfully withdraw, for the most part, did not reach either the Romanian Bridgehead nor the Hungarian border crossing because on September 17, 1939, Soviet troops took over that very bridgehead and cut off the routes of escape. Only 60,000 to 80,000 Polish soldiers escaped German, Soviet, or Slovak capture or the need to hide to continue the fight as underground soldiers.

== Polish counterattack ==
The Germans advanced too fast for the units of the Polish Army to be in a position to counterattack, or for other armies to encircle the Germans by forcing their spear heads into a small narrow corridor between Łódź and Warsaw. The only major Polish offensive action occurred during the Battle of Bzura river marshes also known as the Battle of Kutno (township).

== Aftermath ==
All of Poland fell completely under the control of Nazi Germany, the Soviet Union and the Slovak Republic on October 6, 1939. By 1940 the city of Łódź was renamed Litzmannstadt and became an important industrial city for the German war machine. Munitions and uniforms were manufactured in the newly established Ghetto Litzmannstadt by Jewish slave labor. Jews from Poland, Germany, Benelux and Czechoslovakia as well as Roma people from Austria were brought to live and work there in appalling conditions. While most of them were taken for extermination in the Nazi death camps, more than 70,000 survived until the summer of 1944. But the Soviet move forward stopped and in August 1944 those survivors were also killed by the Nazis. At the end of the war Łódź was taken by the Soviet Army on January 17, 1945, without substantial damage to the city. Only 877 Jews survived to the moment of liberation. Tens of thousands of ethnic Poles were expelled from the city. In 1939, at least 10,000 Poles were expelled. A concentration camp was built for the children of the ethnic Poles. Later, the dwellings of the Poles were taken over by the ethnic Germans from the Soviet Union. 300,000 Jews and 120,000 ethnic Poles died during the Nazi occupation.

== See also ==
- List of World War II military equipment of Poland
- List of German military equipment of World War II
