= Warsaw Army =

The Warsaw Army (Polish: Armia Warszawa) was one of the Polish armies to take part in the Polish Defensive War of 1939. Created on 8 September, eight days after the invasion begun, it was an improvised formation charged with the defence of the Polish capital of Warsaw (Warszawa).

== Tasks ==
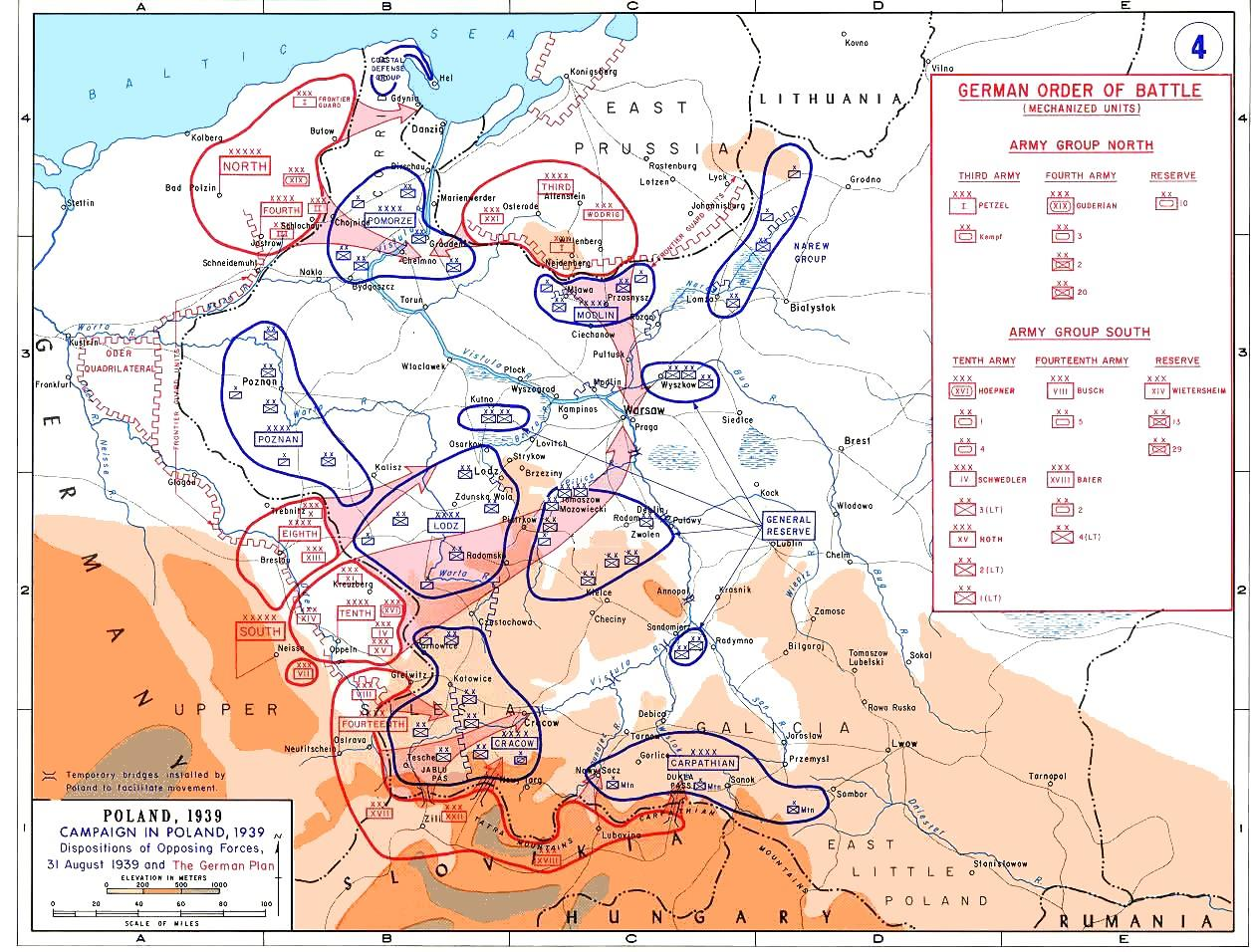
Forces as of 31 August and German plan of attack.

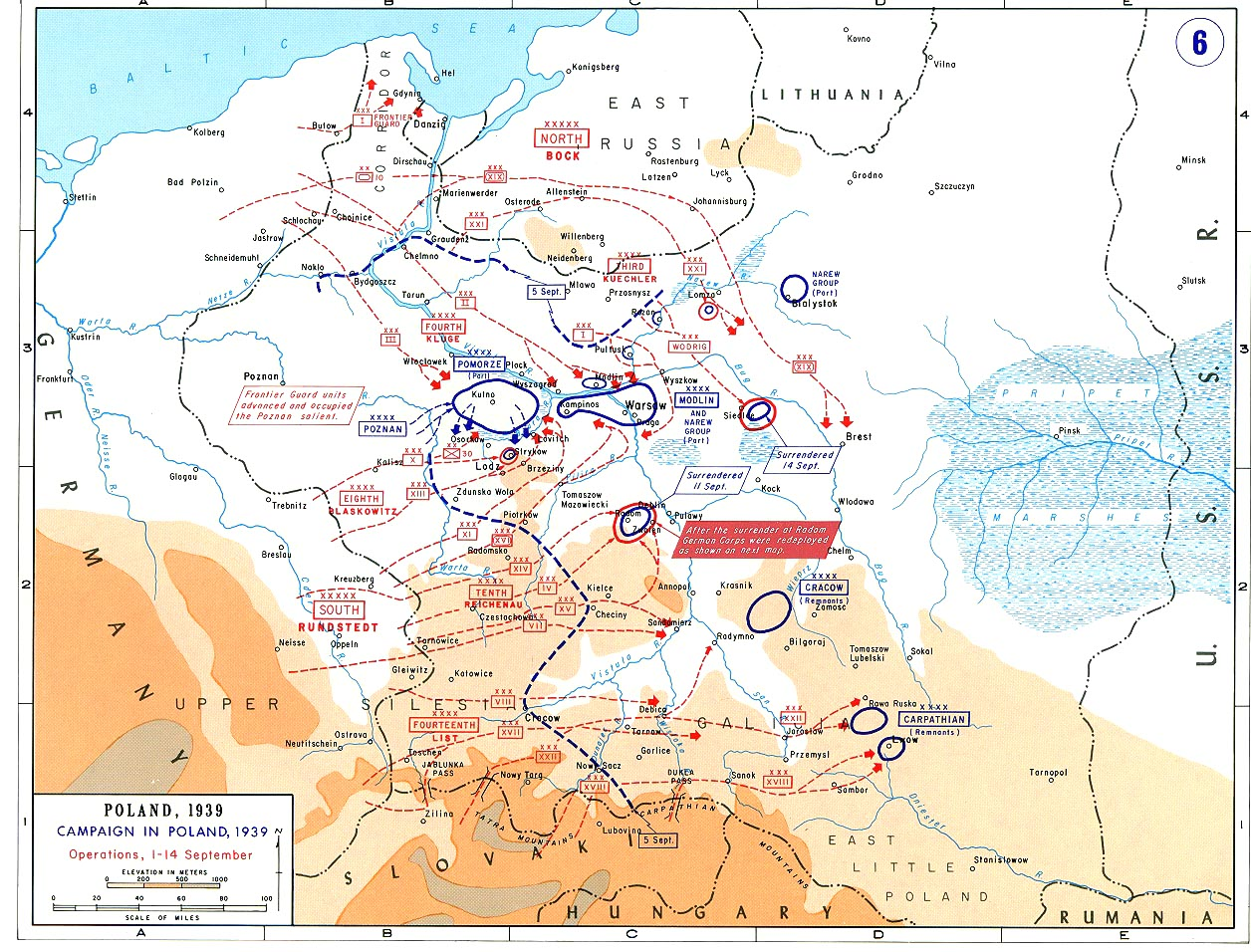
Forces as of 14 September with troop movements up to this date.

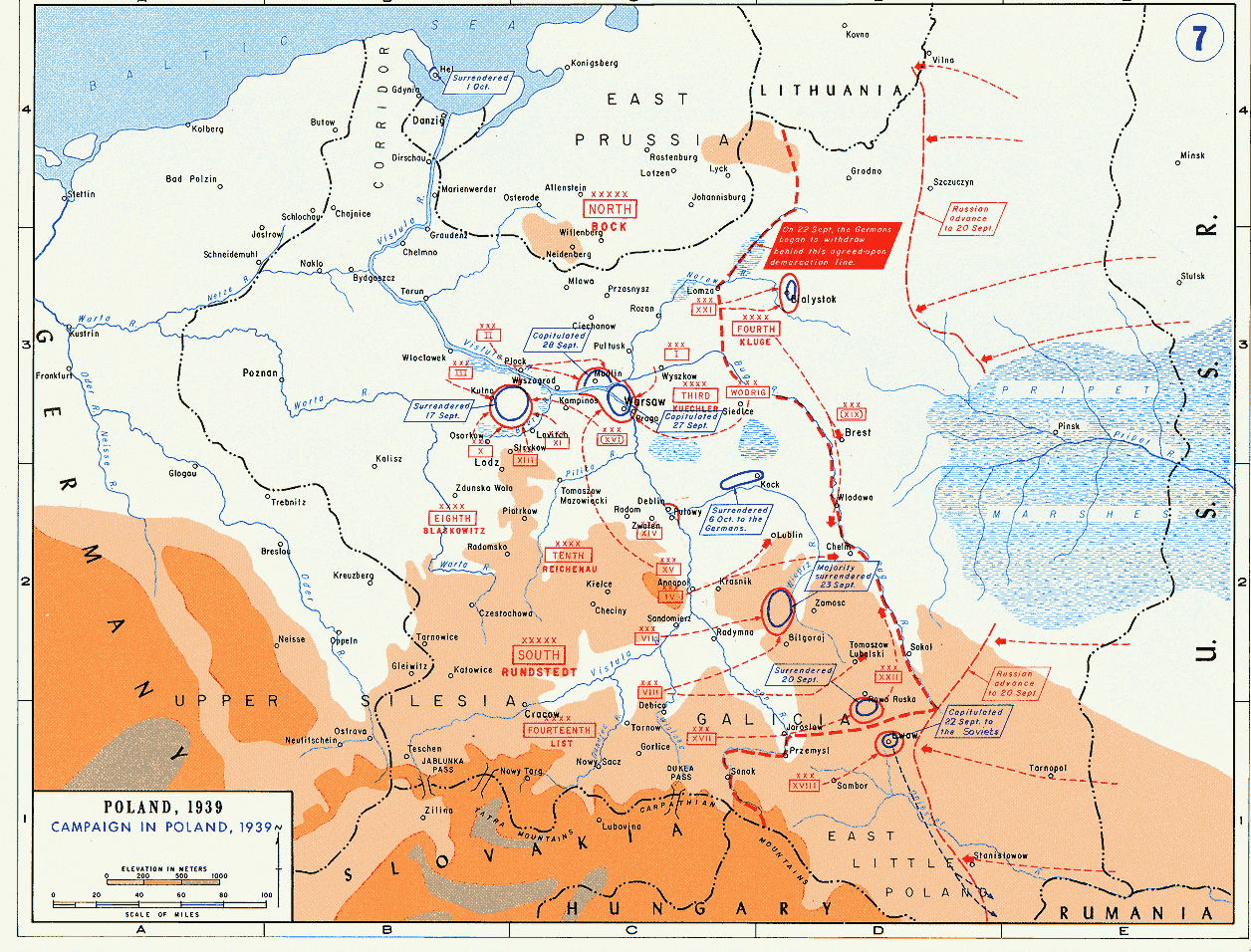
Forces after 14 September with troop movements after this date

To defend the Polish capital Warsaw in the face of breakthrough by the German forces.

== Operational history ==
On 3 September 1939 the Minister of the Army (Min. Spraw Wojskowych), general Tadeusz Kasprzycki, ordered general Walerian Czuma (the Commander of the Border Guards - Straż Graniczna) to organize a force to defend the city of Warsaw against a German attack. The city had been under constant attack by the Luftwaffe since the early morning of 1 September. Initially the only organized units available to him were four infantry battalions, anti-aircraft artillery and anti-aircraft machine guns detachments under colonel Kazimierz Baran, composed mostly of fire-fighter brigades and volunteers supervised by colonel Tadeusz Bogdanowicz and Julian Kulski, the deputy president of Warsaw. The AA artillery had 86 pieces of anti-aircraft artillery, as well as an unknown number of anti-aircraft machine guns. In addition there was an air force Pursuit Brigade which was equipped with 54 fighter aircraft. On the 5 and 6 September the air force and 11 batteries of anti-aircraft artillery were withdrawn to Lublin. Initially however parts of various army units, primarily of Łódź Army, retreating before the onslaught of German armor units, were added to his force.

On 8 September General Juliusz Rómmel, the commander of the Łódź Army who had become separated from his operational units, arrived in Warsaw with his staff. The chief of staff of the Polish Armed Forces, general Wacław Stachiewicz (then in Brześć), appointed him the overall commander of all forces defending Warsaw, including the Warsaw Defense Force, the Modlin Fortress and the army units immediately south and north-east of Warsaw

During the next days, army units retreating in face of the onslaughts of the German armor and under continuous air attacks, fought their way through the German lines to the besieged capital, in particular from the Battle of Bzura. After 13 September Warsaw and Modlin were effectively surrounded. The only way the Polish units were able to reach the besieged area was through the Kampinos Forest between Warsaw and the Vistula river. On 22 September German forces cut through the remaining lines of communication between Warsaw and Modlin.

On 26 September, after heavy bombardment had cut off water and the civilian population was starving, the city was forced to surrender. On 28 September the Polish forces in Warsaw capitulated; fort Modlin capitulated the following day.

== Units ==
Commander: General Juliusz Rómmel

Chief of staff: col Aleksander Pragłowski

Deputy Commander: General Tadeusz Kutrzeba, was commander of Army Poznan - reached Warsaw 16 September.

Commander of Warsaw Garrison: Walerian Czuma

=== Warsaw West ===
Commander: General Walerian Czuma,

- 40th Infantry Regiment "Children of Lwów" (Lt.Col. Józef Kalandyk) - transport through Warsaw stopped 7 September.
- Legia Akademicka (Academic Legion) - made up of students of the universities.
- Volunteer Units

Elements of Army Poznań

- 25th Infantry Division. (Gen. Franciszek Alter) - elements fight through enemy lines 20 September.
- 14 Cavalry Ulan Regiment (Col. Edward Godlewski) - 431 survivors charge through enemy lines 19 September
- Podole Cavalry Brigade (Col. Leon Strzelecki) - fights through German lines 20 September
- Wielkopolska Cavalry Regiment (Gen. Roman Abraham) - fights through enemy lines 20 September.

Elements of Army Pomorze

- 15th Infantry Division, (Gen. Zdzislaw Przyjalkowski) - 1500 survivors fight through 22 September.
- Pomorze Cavalry Brigade (Col. Adam Bogoria-Zakrzewski) - survivors fight through 20 September.

=== Warsaw East ===
Commander: 5 September Lt.Col. Julian Janowski; from 15 September Gen. Juliusz Zulauf (originally Commander of 5th Infantry Division)

Elements of Army Modlin

- 5th Infantry Division (Gen. Juliusz Zulauf) retreated from river Narew front 13 September.
- 20th Infantry Division (Col. Wilhelm Andrzej Lawicz-Liszka) - arrived from north 15 September
- 21st Infantry Regiment "Children of Warsaw" (Col. Stanisław Sosabowski) - separated from 8th Infantry Division, arrived 21 September.

=== Modlin Fortress ===
Commander: Gen.Wiktor Thommée - after 12 September.

Elements of Modlin Army

- 5th Infantry Division - some elements retreated from battle near Dębe on Narew river - 14 Sept
- 8th Infantry Division (Col. Teodor Wiktor Furgalski) - remains of division after retreat from north (mainly 32 Inf.Reg. and some units of artillery) - from 8 September

Elements of Poznań Army and Pomorze Army remains arrived from the Battle of Bzura after 18 September.

- 36th Infantry Regiment

Elements of Łódź Army arrived on 13 September.

- 30th Infantry Division (Gen. Leopold Cehak)
- Wołyńska Cavalry Brigade (col. Julian Filipowicz)

== See also ==
- List of Polish armies in World War II
- Łódź Army
- Siege of Warsaw (1939)
- Battle of Modlin
