= Józef Piłsudski Institute of America =

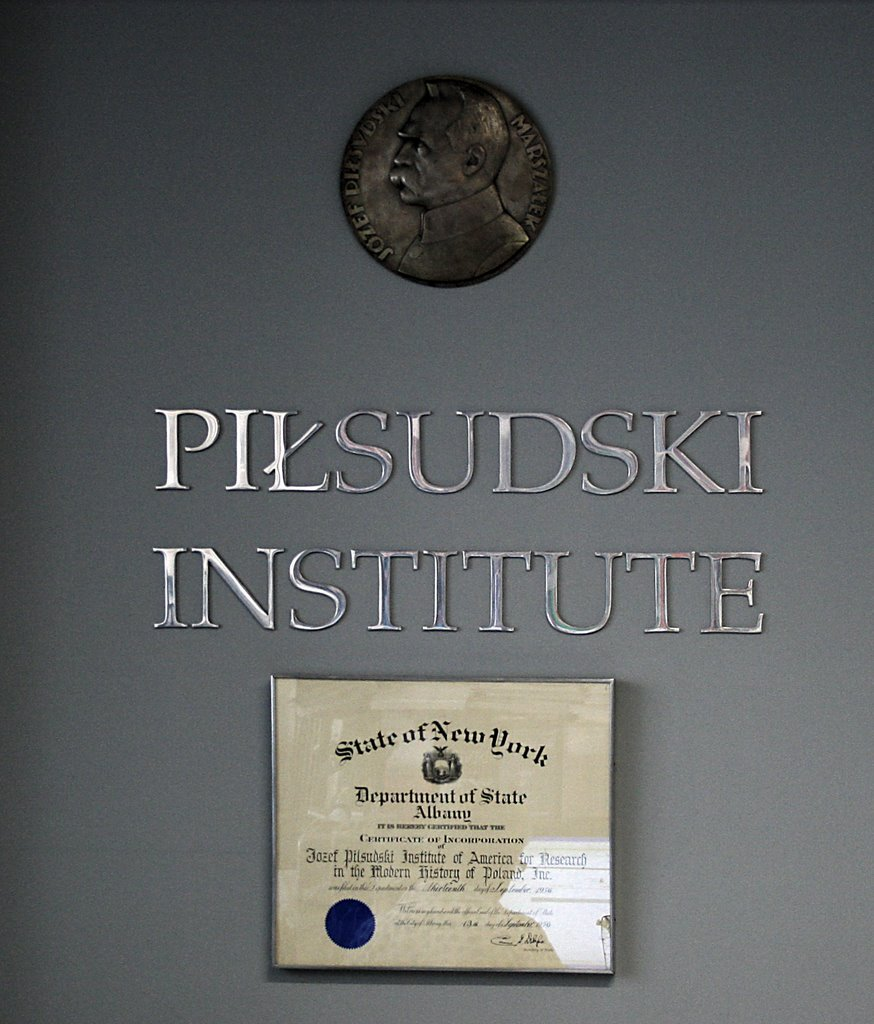
- Founders: Henryk Floyar-Rajchman, Franciszek Januszewski, Wacław Jędrzejewicz, Lucjusz Kupferwasser, Stefan Łodzieski, Ignacy Matuszewski, Ignacy Nurkiewicz, Maksymilian Węgrzynek
- Established: 1943; 83 years ago
- Mission: Research in the Modern History of Poland
- President: Iwona Korga
- Address: 138 Greenpoint Avenue, Greenpoint, Brooklyn, NY 11222
- Location: New York City
- Coordinates: 40°43′48″N 73°57′18″W
- Interactive map of Józef Piłsudski Institute of America
- Website: www.pilsudski.org

The Józef Piłsudski Institute of America (full name: Józef Piłsudski Institute of America for Research in the Modern History of Poland) is a museum and research center devoted to the study of modern Polish history and named after the Polish interwar statesman Józef Piłsudski located in Greenpoint, Brooklyn.

== History ==
=== Origins ===
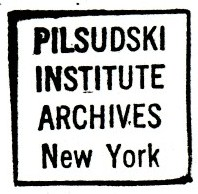
Stamp applied by the archive to documents.

The Piłsudski Institute of America, a research organization and archive, came into being during the General Assembly of the National Committee of Americans of Polish Extraction (KNAPP), held at the Washington Hotel in New York City on July 3–4, 1943. The eight-member organizational committee included three interwar colleagues of Marshal Józef Piłsudski: Wacław Jędrzejewicz, former Minister of Education; Henryk Floyar-Rajchman, former Minister of Commerce and Industry; and Ignacy Matuszewski, former Finance Minister. Also present were well-known Polish-Americans including Franciszek Januszewski, editor of the Detroit Polish Daily; Maksymilian Węgrzynek, editor of the New York Nowy Świat; and Lucjan Kupferwasser and W. Skubikowski from Chicago.

Jędrzejewicz commented on that event in one of his press releases: "Taking advantage of the presence of several prominent Polish émigré activists, we decided to bring to fruition a plan that had been in the works for a long time, namely, to call into existence on July 4 the Józef Piłsudski Institute, dedicated to the research of the most recent history of Poland." This newly created entity picked up the tradition of an earlier research center established in Warsaw in 1923 and renamed after Marshal Piłsudski after his death in 1936. The organizers of the New York research center were keenly aware of the importance of collecting documents related to such a crucial period in Polish history as World War II. The initiative was also welcomed by the Polish government-in-exile – the Prime Minister and Commander-in-Chief at the time, General Władysław Sikorski and his two successors, General Kazimierz Sosnkowski (Commander-in-Chief) and Prime Minister Stanisław Mikołajczyk.

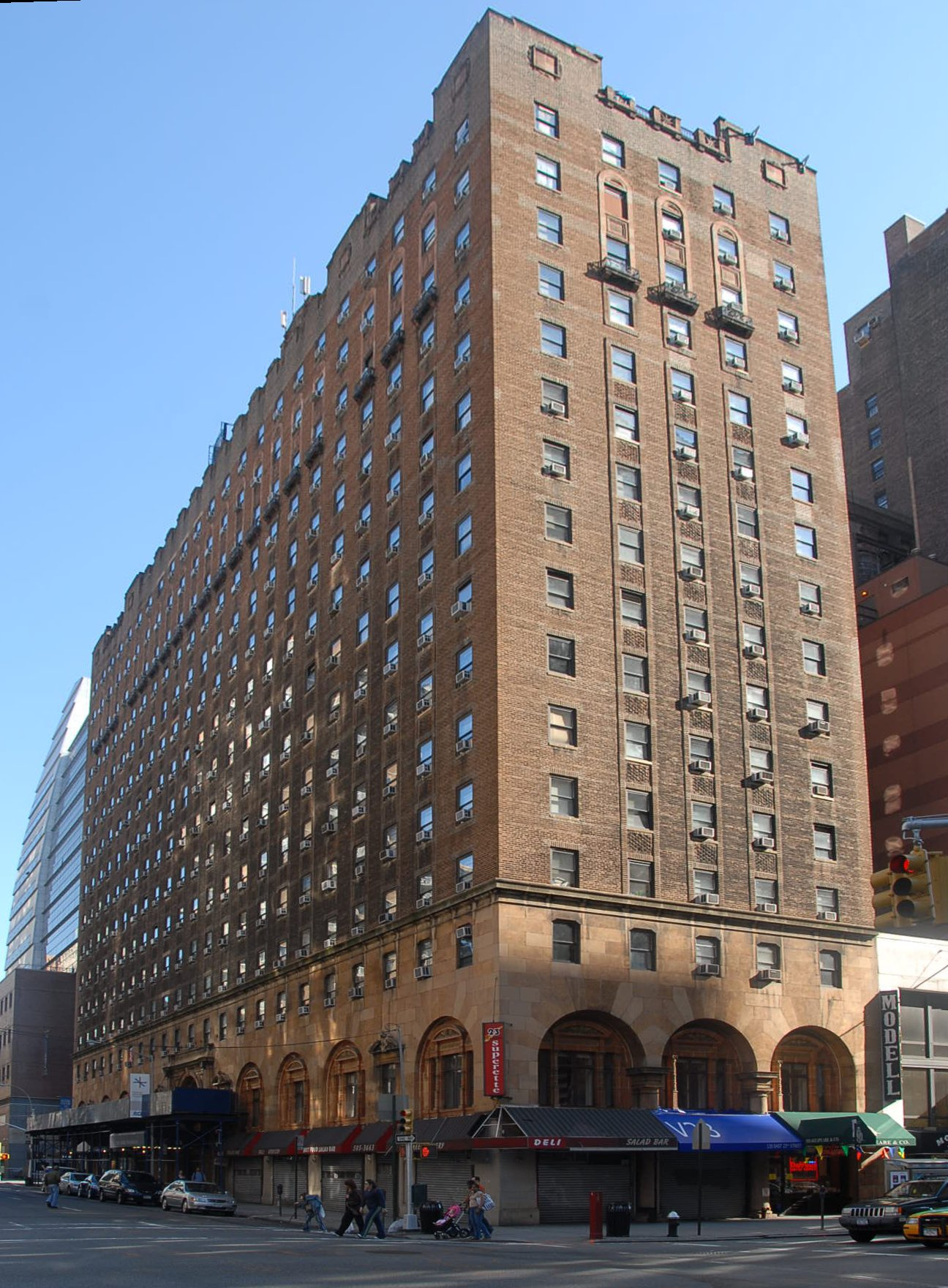
George Washington Hotel on Lexington Avenue in Gramercy Park, the place where the Piłsudski Institute was conceived on July 4, 1943

The death of General Sikorski on July 4, 1943, coincided with the disclosure by the Germans of the massacre of Polish officers in Katyn Forest by the Soviet NKVD. The appeal made to the International Red Cross by the Polish government-in-exile for an investigation of the atrocity was used by Stalin as a pretext to break off Polish-Russian diplomatic relations. This was a critical moment; Poland's historical and cultural heritage was at risk from both the Soviet Union and Nazi Germany. After displacing the Red Army from the eastern regions of Poland, the Nazis occupied the entire country; their aim was the destruction of Polish scholarship and cultural heritage. This plan was being implemented through the extermination of the middle class, the intelligentsia, systematic plundering of libraries and museums, and by forbidding cultural, educational, and artistic activities. These actions were reinforced by mass arrests and deportations to concentration camps (such as Sonderaktion Krakau), which led to the murder of nearly all faculty of the Jagiellonian University. The closure of the Polish Academy of Sciences and other research and academic institutions left no doubt as to the Germans' intentions.

Matters looked grim across Axis-occupied Europe. After the surrender of France in 1940 and the addition of Italy to the German war effort, all outposts of the Polish Academy of Sciences in Paris and Rome ceased to function. The day after the Germans entered the French capital, Gestapo agents appeared in the Polish Library on the Île St. Louis. Although the library's director, Franciszek Pułaski, had removed the most valuable items and taken them to the south of France, the Germans confiscated or destroyed the remaining book collection and the building. Only in Great Britain and the United States did the Poles have any possibility of conducting scholarly and cultural activities.

At the organizational meeting of the institute, the following decisions were taken:

- Form an eight-member organizational committee
- Conduct all activities of the Warsaw Institute in absentia
- Continue all activities as an American affiliate of the Warsaw headquarters after the war

Franciszek Januszewski was named head of the Organization Committee, Ignacy Matuszewski his deputy, Marta Kozłowska from New Jersey secretary and Józef Piech treasurer. The remaining members of the committee were Henryk Floyar-Rajchman, Maksymilian Węgrzynek, Lucjan Kupferwasser, W. Skubikowski and Jan Z. Dodatko from Detroit. On July 5, 1943, at its first meeting, Wacław Jędrzejewicz became the first director of the newly created Piłsudski Institute of America. The basis of the institute's bylaws was adopted, specifying that "The Institute's principal aim is the collection, preservation, and research of documents related to Poland's most recent history starting in 1863, creation of archives of historical texts, publishing of books and of academic papers pertinent to that field, offering scholarships for research in the history of Poland, organizing lectures and conferences" as well as – most importantly – gathering pertinent documents for rebuilding the collections of the institute in Warsaw which were destroyed by the Germans and Russians.

At the second meeting of the Committee on September 16 of that year, Januszewski resigned as president and was replaced on an interim basis by Ignacy Matuszewski until the General Assembly of all members and the election of a new board. The third meeting of the Committee took place on December 16, when the president pro tempore reported on the institute's activities to date and the state of its finances. The final version of the bylaws was voted on, and 48 regular members joined. Other membership categories were established (supporting, life, and correspondent members).

The beginnings of this new entity, located at 105 East 22nd Street in Manhattan, were modest; the treasury contained $30. During the summer Jędrzejewicz toured areas with large Polish populations (including Detroit, Chicago, and Philadelphia), giving presentations, explaining the goals and the reasons behind the institute, and recruiting new members. This activity also intended to forge bonds between pro-independence Polish communities, encourage the collection and preservation of important archival documents, and have them transferred to the institute. As a result, the institute received a valuable collection of books and documents related to World War II and the activities of Polish groups in France, Great Britain, and the Near East.

=== After World War II ===
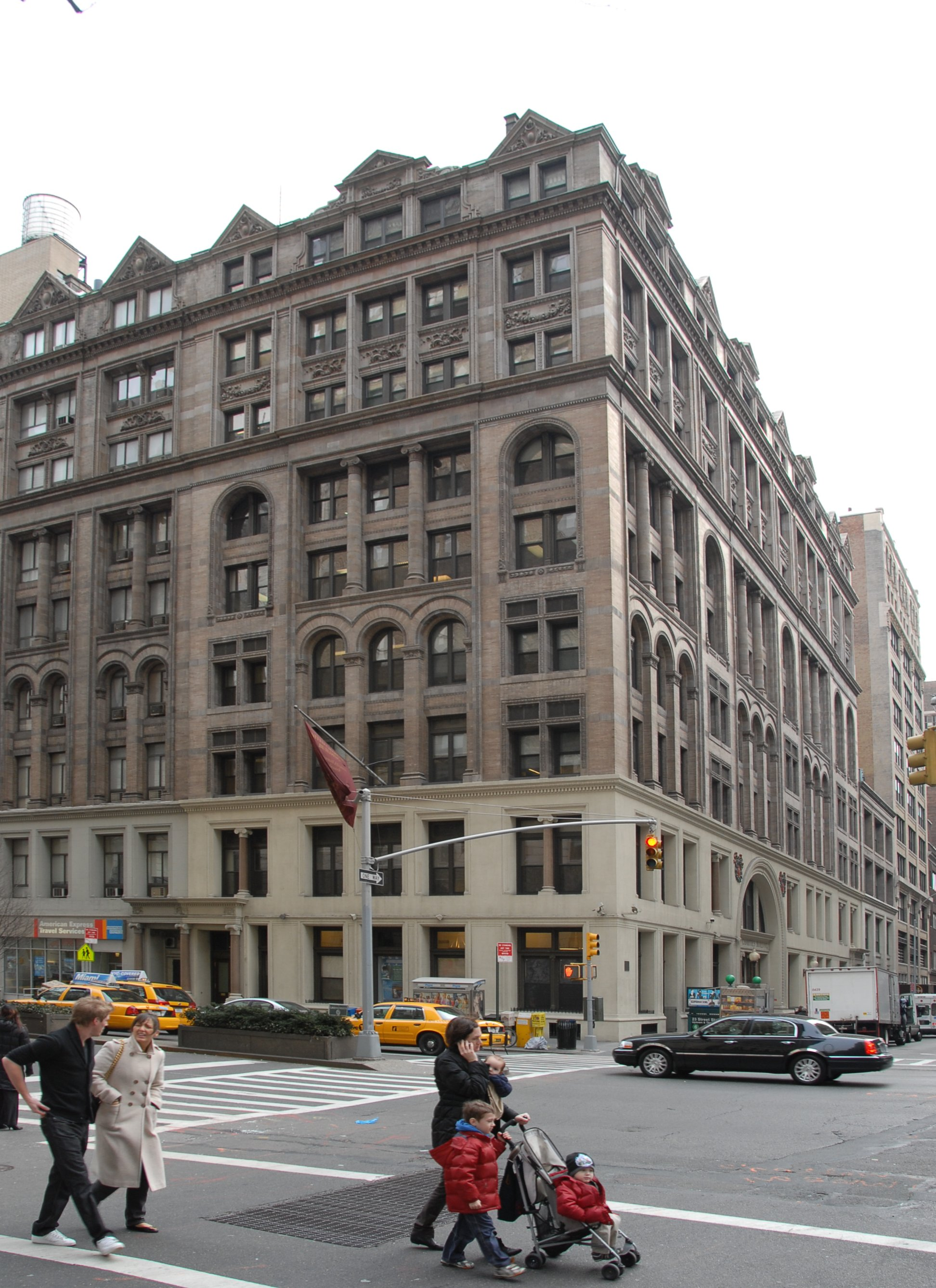
105 East 22nd Street, Manhattan – Piłsudski institute's first location, in the United Charities Building, Gramercy Park.

The original intent of reconstructing the institute which had existed before the war in Warsaw was not feasible because of the Yalta Agreement, which left the Polish nation for the next half-century within the Soviet sphere of influence. International recognition of the Polish government-in-exile was canceled on July 5, 1945, by Great Britain and the US (and subsequently by most members of the newly created United Nations), followed by the recognition of the Provisional Government of National Unity in Warsaw and the acceptance of the results of the election held under Russian control in January 1947. In consequence, the founders of the institute (including the board) opted for operating a permanent and independent research organization. Its mission was now not only to gather and consolidate documents related to current political affairs but also to disseminate accurate historical knowledge about Poland and its recent history.

It was an ambitious undertaking since the institute's founders could not count on any assistance from the Polish government-in-exile in London. From its earliest days, the functioning of the institute depended on financial help offered by Polish émigré activists, dues, and donations. From the end of the 1940s, when the National Committee of Polish-Americans ceased to exist, the activities and statements by leaders of the institute were perceived as sui generis instructions for the independence circles. These people formed a highly cohesive group, which (faithful to Marshal Piłsudski's ideals) refused to accept any compromise concerning Poland's independence and the integrity of her borders. They rejected the position espoused by then-Prime Minister Stanisław Mikołajczyk which promoted accepting the Treaty of Yalta and the Provisional Government of National Unity (TRJN) and later took a firmly anti-communist stand, refusing all contacts with organizations in the Polish People's Republic (PRL). From 1943 onwards those involved with the institute were critical of the political stance of the great powers, accusing them of betraying Poland. That attitude isolated the institute, particularly in the 1960s and 1970s when a significant number of Polish-Americans opted for some form of contact with certain PRL organizations (if only to be able to revisit the country of their birth).

In the early stages of the institute's existence, there were hopes for expanding its mission beyond the United States into other countries, where there were prominent Polish politicians and military personnel. Contact was established with the Piłsudski Group in the Middle East where Janusz Jędrzejewicz, Wiktor T. Drymmer, Tadeusz Schaetzel and others were active. This cooperation continued after the group moved to Lebanon. An affiliate of the institute was also established in Ankara through a group of politicians, among them Michał Sokolnicki. A Józef Piłsudski Society (still active as of 2011) was organized in São Paulo, Brazil; among its members were Czesław Świrski and Karol Przetakiewicz. These efforts did not produce long-lasting results, however, mainly because of continuing migration of the military and politicians to London. After his visit to Canada and the United States in 1946, General Władysław Bortnowski founded the Piłsudski Institute in London on March 15, 1947, with the participation of Janusz Gołuchowski, Ludwika Piskora, Wacław Stachiewicz, Stefan Dąb-Biernacki, Jan Piłsudski, Juliusz Łukasiewicz, Edward Kleszczyński and others. At first, it was viewed as an affiliate of the institute in New York but later became independent.

From its inception the Piłsudski Institute of America struggled with many problems (mostly financial), trying to survive while continuing its activities according to its founding principles. It survived during that critical period because of the efforts of its founders and directors, who donated their time and effort from its foundation. Some of the founders, chairmen, directors, and active members were Franciszek Januszewski, Ignacy Matuszewski, Maksymilian Węgrzynek, Wacław Jędrzejewicz, Marian Chodacki, Adam Koc, Jan Kowalski, Stefan Łodzieski, General Wincenty Kowalski, Damian Wandycz, General Władysław Bortnowski, Henryk Floyar-Rajchman, and in later years Aleksander Mełeń-Korczyński, Michał Budny, Halina Janiszewska, Andrzej Zatemba, Tadeusz Pawłowicz, Danuta and Andrzej Cisek, Stanisław Jordanowski, Zarema Bau, Magdalena Kapuścińska, Andrzej Beck, Czesław Karkowski, Jerzy Prus, Janusz Cisek and Jacek Gałązka. Due to their efforts, financial support, and fundraising initiatives, the institute survived and eventually flourished, developing its activities in publishing and cataloging its extensive collection. Its unique library of documents and source material unavailable in Poland (or in other collections abroad) continue to attract many visitors who utilize these research materials. Among those who have visited the institute over the years for information and advice are Americans, Englishmen, Belorussians, Ukrainians, Danes, Germans, Japanese, and Lithuanians.

During the 1940s, members of the institute began to outreach to like-minded foreigners such as Henryk Wereszycki. At that time, efforts were undertaken to help the former Prime Minister of Poland Kazimierz Świtalski and Col. Wacław Lipiński to leave Poland. Publications and other materials were also sent to Poland, to Stanisław Płoski and others. These contacts were interrupted at the end of the 1940s during Stalinism and resumed after the "political thawing" in October 1956, when it became easier to travel from Poland to the West. At that time, Polish students who received scholarships from American foundations and from the Kościuszko Foundation began visiting the institute. Efforts were made to single out independent scholars and researchers who, after their return to Poland, would present an unbiased picture of World War II without the communist ideological influence. Inspiring a truly independent thought process in Poland only became possible in the 1970s and '80s, however, when the institute developed its own scholarship program supporting young scholars belonging to non-communist political groups.

In the early '80s, Ukrainian-American historian Taras Hunczak used much of the institute's archives to publish the academic work Ukraine and Poland in Documents: 1918-1923.

=== Since 1989 ===
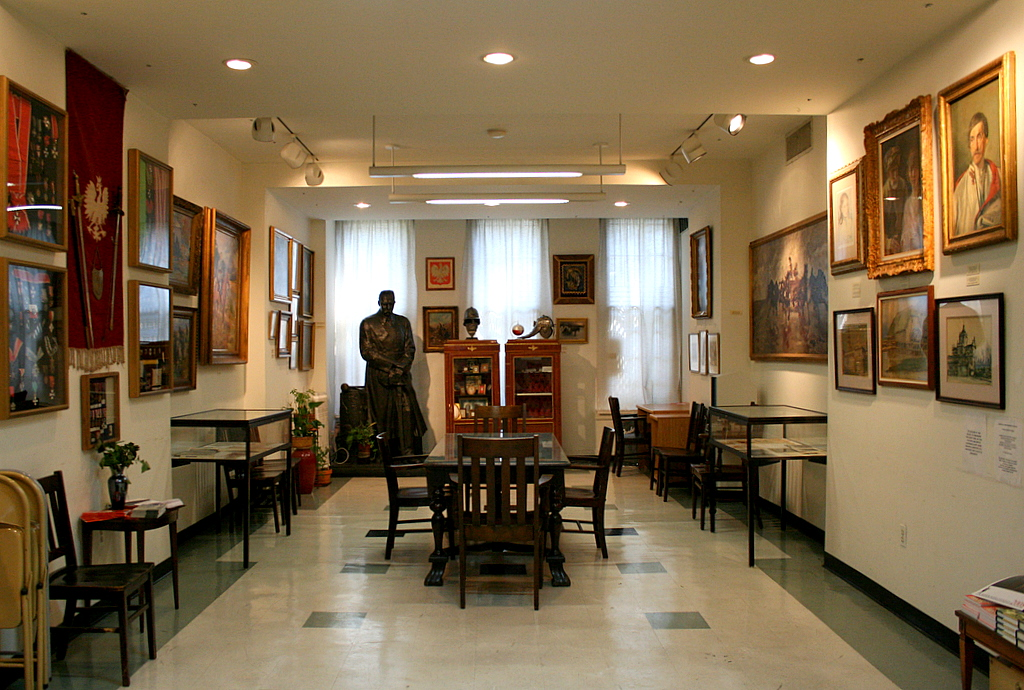
Exhibition hall at the institute.

Following the fall of the communist government in Poland in 1989, the Piłsudski Institute of America became an officially recognized organization; its increased stature in Poland was evidenced by visits from senior members of the Polish government. In 1991 the former president of the Republic of Poland visited the institute, followed in 1992 by then-Prime Minister Jan Olszewski. Due to the political and economic changes in Poland, it became possible to develop active cooperation with Polish academic and research institutions, such as the National Library in Warsaw, the Ossolineum Institute in Wrocław, Jagiellonian University in Cracow, and the Warsaw University library. After extensive reorganization of the library collection in the mid-1990s it was discovered that the institute possessed duplicate copies of certain publications, which were then offered to American and Polish academic institutions and the University of Düsseldorf. Duplicate copies of books were presented to regional libraries in Bytom, Słupsk, Kielce and Rzeszów. With the assistance of Jan Malicki (editor of the magazine Przegląd Wschodni), some books found their way to libraries and schools in the former Polish eastern regions of present-day Ukraine and Belarus. In addition to the cooperation with the National Library in Warsaw (which sent librarians to help organize the institute's library), the National Archives in Warsaw offers aid of archivists, who help to modernize the document collections annually with the help of the Kosciuszko Foundation.

== Publications ==
During its years as an émigré political outpost, the institute made efforts to publish trustworthy sources of recent Polish history. Examples of that activity are the English-language editions of Poland in the British Parliament, volumes 1-3 (edited by Wacław Jędrzejewicz) and memoirs of former Polish ambassador to Paris Juliusz Łukasiewicz and former Polish ambassador to Berlin Józef Lipski. Other English-language publications of scholars connected with the institute are those of Marian K. Dziewanowski, Janusz K. Zawodny, Stanisław Blejwas, Piotr Wandycz, Anna Cięciała and Tytus Komarnicki.

At the same time, both Institutes (in London and New York) published the magazine Niepodległość (Independence), originally begun in 1930s Warsaw by the Institute of Research of Recent History of Poland. Published by the institute were books by Professor Wacław Jędrzejewicz: Kronika Życia Józefa Piłsudskiego (a biography of Józef Piłsudski) in two volumes and the four-volume Kalendarium Życia Józefa Piłsudskiego (Chronicle of the Life of Józef Piłsudski, co-authored with Janusz Cisek); Krzyż Niepodległości, wspomnienia ze służby w Legionach (a memoir of service in the Piłsudski Legions) by Józef Herzog; and Wspomnienia, a memoir by Juliusz Tarnowski.

The research materials assembled at the institute have been used in exhibitions, films, and publications including Bitter Glory by Richard M. Watt; The Heart of Europe: A Short History of Poland by Norman Davies; The Exile Mission: The Polish Political Diaspora and Polish Americans 1939–1956 by Anna Jaroszyńska-Kirchman; the US Holocaust Memorial Museum's internet exhibit Fight and Rescue; and the film The World was Ours: The Jewish Legacy of Vilna, directed by Mia Van Doren.

The institute continues to present exhibitions and lectures. Lecturers and presenters at the institute have included prominent writers, Solidarity activists, and academics: Wojciech Ziembiński, Marian Gołębiewski, Janusz Onyszkiewicz, Anna Walentynowicz, Piotr Naimski, Andrzej Nowak, Norman Davies, Janusz K. Zawodny, Juliusz Łukasiewicz and Grażyna Jonkaitys-Luba.

== Collections ==
As of 2011, among Polish libraries and research centers in the United States, the Piłsudski Institute of America has the largest collection of documents concerning the recent history of Poland (exceeded only by that of the Hoover Institution at Stanford University in California). The collection includes archives salvaged during World War II from its predecessor (the former Research Institute of Most Recent History of Poland), the Belvedere Collection (part of which consists in the archive of the Commander-in-Chief), materials from the Liquidation Committee of General Lucjan Żeligowski, the archive of the Ukrainian Military Mission in Poland and the archive of the Silesian Uprisings smuggled out of Poland in September 1939.

The original modest archive grew significantly through donations and bequests. New, valuable materials continued to be added from the diplomatic outposts of the Polish Republic, portfolios of private individuals, and documents reflecting the organizational efforts of the Polish émigré communities which found themselves in Germany at the end of the war. Documents gathered in the United States constitute about 80% of the institute's collection. They illustrate the activities of American Polonia and include materials and documents offered by prominent statesmen, politicians, and military personalities such as historian Władysław Pobóg-Malinowski (who died in France but left his archive in New York). Other archives include those of Józef Lipski, Michał Sokolnicki, Juliusz Łukasiewicz, General Kazimierz Sosnkowski, Jan Weinstein and Tadeusz Katelbach. Organizations such as the Polskie Centrum Informacyjne (Polish Information Center) and Samodzielna Placówka Wywiadowcza ESTEZET (Polish Independent Intelligence Unit) have also archived their documents with the institute. There are also earlier archives spanning the period from the second half of the 18th century to the middle of the 19th, including the collections of Leon Orłowski (1891–1976) and Walerian Płatonow (from 1818 to 1865). The total collection is estimated at one million pages of documents.

The institute's research library contains about 23,000 volumes. At first, the books came mostly from the Polish Information Center and the Ministry of Information and Documentation in London, from the editors of the publications Rój and Płomyk, from the Literary Institute in Paris, Gryf Publishers, and the Polish Cultural Foundation. In 1949 the library contained 2,500 volumes but with time the number of books grew, fed by individual and institutional donations (such as donations from Ignacy Matuszewski, Lucjan Kupferwasser, Wacław Jędrzejewicz, General Tadeusz Kasprzycki, General Kazimierz Sosnkowski, Józef Lipski, Michał Sokolnicki, Tadeusz Katelbach, Edward Kleszczyński, Władysław Pobóg-Malinowski and Bohdan Pawłowicz's family.

The institute also has an audio-visual collection. Included are recordings of people who survived the Soviet labor camps, and personal recollections of politicians like Stefan Korboński and Jerzy (Jur) Lerski. There are about 3,000 press clippings and articles, from Na Straży (On Guard) published in Jerusalem when Polish troops were stationed in Palestine and Polak w Libanie (The Pole in Lebanon, published in Beirut) to press releases from the Solidarity movement. The stamp collection contains postcards and stamps from as far back as 1818, and includes 700 postcards in a section under the heading "The Legions and their Founder". The medal, medallion, and plaque collection include items such as the medal commemorating the 1808 Battle of Somosierra and 20 medals honoring Marshal Piłsudski. The 20,000-item collection of maps and photographs is a work in progress as of 2011. An art collection of some 240 watercolors, oil paintings, and drawings is preserved and displayed at the institute. It includes works by noted Polish painters Jan Matejko, Juliusz Kossak, Józef Brandt, Wojciech Gerson, Leon Wyczółkowski, Aleksander Gierymski, Julian Fałat, Jacek Malczewski and Stanisław Wyspiański.

== Presidents of the institute ==
- 1943–1944 Franciszek Januszewski
- 1944–1951 Stefan Łodzieski
- 1951–1953 Franciszek Januszewski
- 1954–1955 Ignacy Nurkiewicz
- 1955–1961 Henryk Korab-Janiewicz
- 1961–1962 Władysław Bortnowski
- 1962–1965 Henryk Korab-Janiewicz
- 1965–1966 Ignacy Nurkiewicz
- 1966–1969 Henryk Korab-Janiewicz
- 1969–1972 Wiesław Domaniewski
- 1972–1977 Jan Fryling
- 1977–1978 Wacław Jędrzejewicz
- 1978–1983 Tadeusz Pawłowicz
- 1983–1993 Stanisław Jordanowski
- 1993–1999 Andrzej Beck
- 1999–2008 Jacek Gałązka
- 2008–2016 Magdalena Kapuścińska
- 2016–present Iwona Korga

== Executive Directors of the institute ==
- 1943–1948 Wacław Jędrzejewicz
- 1949–1951 Marian Chodacki
- 1951–1956 Damian Stanisław Wandycz
- 1956–1963 Wincenty Kowalski
- 1963–1964 Wacław Jędrzejewicz
- 1964–1972 Jan Fryling
- 1973–1983 Michał Budny
- 1984–1985 Stanisław Jordanowski
- 1986–1988 Czesław Karkowski
- 1989–1991 Jerzy Prus
- 1992–2000 Janusz Cisek
- 2005–present Iwona Korga

== See also ==
- Józef Piłsudski Institute for Research in Modern History of Poland, Warsaw (1923–1939)
- Józef Piłsudski Institute in London
- Polish Institute and Sikorski Museum
