= Ignacy Matuszewski =

Polish politician, diplomat, and colonel (1891–1946)

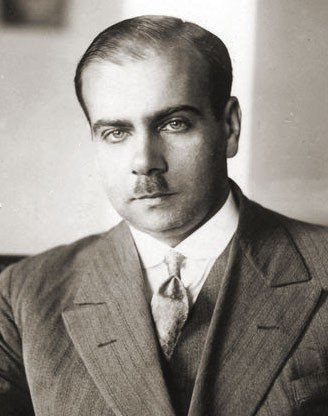
- Matuszewski in 1927

Minister of Finance of Poland
- In office 14 April 1929 – 26 May 1931
- President: Ignacy Mościcki
- Prime Minister: Kazimierz Świtalski; Kazimierz Bartel; Walery Sławek
- Preceded by: Gabriel Czechowicz
- Succeeded by: Jan Piłsudski

Commandant of Minsk
- In office 19 February 1918 – 21 February 1918 Serving with Kastuś Jezavitaŭ
- Preceded by: Position established (Kārlis Landers as President of the Minsk City Executive Committee)
- Succeeded by: Position abolished (Viktar Jarkin as President of the Minsk City Executive Committee)

Personal details
- Born: Ignacy Hugo Stanisław Matuszewski; 10 September 1891 Warsaw, Congress Poland, Russian Empire (now Poland)
- Died: 13 August 1946 (aged 54) New York City, United States
- Party: Nonpartisan Bloc for Cooperation with the Government
- Education: Jagiellonian University

Military service
- Allegiance: Russian Empire; (Second Polish Republic) Poland
- Years of service: 1914–1940
- Rank: Colonel
- Unit: Polish I Corps in Russia; Polish Military Organisation; Second Department
- Battles/wars: World War I; Russian Civil War; Polish–Soviet War

Ignacy Hugo Stanisław Matuszewski (10 September [O.S. 29 August] 1891 – 3 August 1946) was a Polish politician, publicist, diplomat, Minister of Finance of the Second Polish Republic, colonel, infantry officer and intelligence agent of the Polish Army, member of the International Olympic Committee. A strong supporter of Józef Piłsudski, he was counted among the "Colonels" and co-founded the Józef Piłsudski Institute of America.

== Background ==
He was born on 10 September 1891, in Warsaw, a son of Ignacy Matuszewski Sr., a well-known literary critic. Coincidentally, he was also the godson of the preeminent Polish novelist Bolesław Prus.

Ignacy Matuszewski studied philosophy at the Jagiellonian University, architecture in Milan, law in Tartu, and agriculture in Warsaw.

== Career ==
=== World War I ===
During World War I, Matuszewski was one of the executors of Piłsudski's concept in the Russian Empire. From December 1914, he served in the Russian Army, among others as commander of an intelligence troop. After the February Revolution in 1917, he organized the Assembly of Free Poles in Saint Petersburg and participated in the formation of the Polish Corps in Russia. In December 1917 he joined the Polish I Corps in Russia under the command of General Józef Dowbor-Muśnicki.

In the early 1918, Matuszewski received a default death sentence from the Bolsheviks. In response to this threat, he captured Minsk, chasing away the Bolshevik garrison, on 18 February 1918. Two days later, he became the commander of the city. Since the Germans had also sentenced him to death, he decided to move to Kiev. In April 1918, Matuszewski joined the Polish Military Organisation. In May 1918, he participated in the coup directed against General Dowbor-Muśnicki, who wanted to hand control of the Polish I Corps to the Germans at the fortress of Bobrujsk. After the coup failed and the Germans disarmed the Corps, Matuszewski was back in Kiev.

=== Polish–Soviet War ===
Following the regaining of independence by Poland in November 1918, Matuszewski was transferred to the Second Unit (military intelligence) of the General Staff of the Polish Army, of which he became chief at the culmination of the Polish–Soviet War. After the Soviet defeat, Józef Piłsudski summarized the espionage activity of Matuszewski in the following words: "It was the first war since many centuries waged by Poland during which we [Poland] knew more about the enemy than the enemy knew about us." Matuszewski participated in the talks that resulted in the 1921 Treaty of Riga.

=== Interwar ===
From 2 November 1923, until 15 October 1924, Matuszewski was a listener of the III Training Course at the Wyższa Szkoła Wojenna in Warsaw. After the completion of the course and obtaining of an officer's diploma at the General Staff of the Army, he was appointed military attaché in Rome by the Minister of Military Affairs. On 1 December 1924, he was named elder colonel as of 15 August 1924, and ranked nineteenth in the infantry officers' corps. He was moved to the reserves in 1926.

After the May Coup of 1926, Matuszewski was one of the leading representatives of the right-wing among the followers of Marshal Józef Piłsudski. During 1926–28, he served as a Polish representative in Budapest. During 1929–31, he was director of the Ministry of Finance and Minister of Finance in the five following governments (from the cabinet of Kazimierz Świtalski until the second cabinet of Walery Sławek). Between 1932 and 1936, he was the leading publicist of Gazeta Polska (Polish Gazette), whose print run was 35,000 during that period. After Matuszewski's resignation from the newspaper's editing staff, the printing run fell by half. He was also the leading editor of Polityka Narodów, a monthly that analyzed geopolitics, foreign policies of foreign powers, international situation and the place of Poland in the world. In 1937, Matuszewski was awarded the Golden Wawrzyn Akademicki (Academic Laurel) by the Polish Academy of Literature for his "services for the good of literature.".

In March 1938, Matuszewski accurately predicted the outbreak of World War II and its fatal consequences for Poland. On the pages of the Słowo Lwowskie (a Vilnius newspaper), the ex-Minister of Finance launched a campaign for the increase in the Polish military budget and for the formation of three armored divisions. After the Germans had captured Prague on March 15, 1939, he wrote an article in Polityka Gospodarcza calling for the doubling of the size of the Polish Army. The anxious government elite had Matuszewski's text promptly confiscated, but it still appeared in a slightly changed form in Słowo. He was a pessimist, whom Józef Beck did not want to listen to. He had worried that the war would be an unprecedented catastrophe for Poland. The war émigré Władysław Studnicki would later confirm the colonel's critical attitude toward Beck.

Matuszewski thought that Poland could not afford a war with Germany, as the Germans had an enormous military advantage. On the eve of the September Campaign of 1939 he said: "we must lose this war miserably within three months." He also anticipated the destruction of the Republic by the two aggressors, i.e., Nazi Germany and the Soviet Union.

=== World War II ===
In September 1939, he organized, together with Henryk Floyar-Rajchman, the operation to evacuate 75 tons of gold from the Polish National Bank through Romania, Turkey and Syria to France, where he and his wife Halina Konopacka, who assisted him, handed it over to the Polish Government-in-Exile. Removed from service by the government of Władysław Sikorski and compelled by the capitulation of France in June 1940, he set out to seek refuge in the United States. He and Konopacka finally arrived there in September 1941, having traveled through Spain, Portugal and Brazil.

He was opposed to the policies of Władysław Sikorski toward the Soviet Union, for example the Sikorski–Mayski agreement, which he criticized in his writing. Together with Wacław Jędrzejewicz and Henryk Floyar-Rajchman, Matuszewski co-founded the National Committee of Americans of Polish Extraction (KNAPP) and the Józef Piłsudski Institute of America. He worked to persuade Polish public opinion in the U.S. to oppose the policy of concessions to Joseph Stalin.

== Personal life and death ==
"His greatest joy in life", confessed Bohdan Podoski after Matuszewski's death, "was his only daughter, Ewa. He once gave her that which he valued the most: the Cross of Virtuti Militari once awarded to his great-grandfather, as well as a similar order that was his own. The young girl died in the Warsaw Uprising, shot as she was treating wounded soldiers of the Home Army. She was captured by the Germans, whom she did not fear, while performing her duties as a paramedic in the Baszta Insurgent Company to the very end. According to the German narration, Ewa Matuszewska was executed on September 26, 1944, in the vicinity of Aleja Niepodległości (Independence Avenue) in Warsaw for the 'crime' of helping 'lawless individuals'."

Matuszewski died in New York City on 3 August 1946. He was survived by Konopacka, who subsequently remarried.

== Awards ==
Matuszewski was the recipient of The Silver Cross of the Virtuti Militari and of The Estonian Cross of Freedom of the Third Degree.
