= Stefan Łodzieski =

President of the Józef Piłsudski Institute of America
- In office 1944–1951
- Preceded by: Franciszek Januszewski
- Succeeded by: Franciszek Januszewski

Personal details
- Born: 1882 Wierzbno, Congress Poland
- Died: April 24, 1951 (aged 68–69) Cleveland, United States
- Resting place: Cleveland, United States

Stefan Łodzieski (1882 - April 24, 1951) was a Polish-American baker and social activist. He was one of the founders of the Józef Piłsudski Institute of America and served as its second president between 1944 and 1951.

== Early life ==
Born in Wierzbno in 1882, Łodzieski immigrated to the United States in 1902, where he settled in Lakewood, Ohio. In 1911, he started his own bakery, which he eventually made into a bakery shop chain called Lakewood Bakery. He was active in the Polish National Defense Committee and the Komitet Wykonawczy Szkół Dokształcających. Following World War I, he supported the Polish Welfare Association, efficiently helping new Polish immigrants.

== World War II and aftermath ==
Łodzieski was one of the founders of the National Committee of Americans of Polish Extraction (KNAPP) and served as one of the presidents of this organization. In 1943, he became the treasurer and then, in the years 1946–1951, the vice-president of KNAPP. He generously supported many KNAPP activities, making possible the regular publishing of the Biuletyn Organizacyjny KNAPP and financing the initiative of paying for Polish advertisements in the American press.

In 1943, he was one of the founders of the Józef Piłsudski Institute of America and became its lifetime member in December. In the years 1944–1951, he served as president of the Institute and made donations on several occasions. Łodzieski died on April 24, 1951, in Cleveland, Ohio, and was buried there.

== Bibliography ==
- (in Polish) Biogram Stefana Łodzieskiego na stronie Instytutu Józefa Piłsudskiego w Ameryce
