= Marian Chodacki =

Polish politician and diplomat (1898–1975)

Marian Stanisław Chodacki
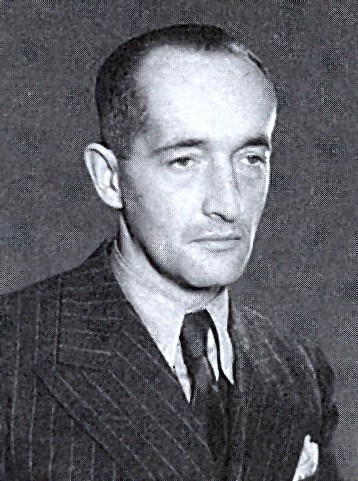
- Born: July 15, 1898; Nowy Sącz, Poland
- Died: June 26, 1975 (aged 76); New York City
- Military career
- Allegiance: Polish Armed Forces
- Branch: Polish Land Forces
- Service years: 1914–1932, 1939–1945
- Rank: certified infantry colonel (pułkownik dyplomowany piechoty)
- Units: 34th Infantry Regiment; 21st Infantry Regiment "Dzieci Warszawy"; General Staff of the Polish Army; 67th Infantry Regiment

Executive Director of the Józef Piłsudski Institute of America
- In office 1949–1951
- Preceded by: Wacław Jędrzejewicz
- Succeeded by: Damian Stanisław Wandycz

Marian Stanisław Chodacki (July 15, 1898, Nowy Sącz – June 26, 1975, New York City) was a Polish diplomat, intelligence officer, certified colonel of the Polish Army, and executive director of the Józef Piłsudski Institute of America.

== Youth and military service ==
He received a law degree from the University of Warsaw.

From 1912 to 1914, Chodacki belonged to the Riflemen's Association. During World War I, he served in the Polish Legions and afterwards continued serving in the Polish Army. On June 1, 1921, he began serving in the Highest Evaluating Commission with the 34th Infantry Regiment in Biała Podlaska. In May 1922, Chodacki was made a lieutenant with retroactive seniority from June 1, 1919.

Chodacki completed studies at the Higher Military Academy in Warsaw from 1922 to 1924. Upon completing his studies in March 1924, he was promoted to the rank of captain with retroactive seniority from July 1, 1923. In October of the following year, he was transferred to the Second Branch of the General Staff of the Polish Army in Warsaw. During his studies and service with the General Staff, he officially remained officer of the 21st Infantry Regiment "Dzieci Warszawy" ("Warsaw's Children"). In 1927, he was appointed as a military attaché to Finland and Sweden. On November 1, 1931, he was attached to the 67th Infantry Regiment in Brodnica and gained practical leadership experience as the head of a riflemen's company.

On December 10, 1932, Chodacki was assigned to the Polish Ministry of Foreign Affairs for a period of six months. Following this assignment, he was simultaneously transferred from active duty to the reserves and from the 21st Infantry Regiment to the 30th Infantry Regiment (30 Pułk Strzelców Kaniowskich) in Warsaw.

== Diplomatic service ==
Chodacki was assigned ministerial adviser in the Political Department of the Ministry of Foreign Affairs. In October, 1935, he became chargé d'affaires in the Polish mission to Czechoslovakia. He was a confidant of Józef Beck, the foreign minister, who considered Chodacki the best politician among the officers transferred from military service to diplomacy.

In December 1936, Chodacki assumed the office of the Commissioner General of the Republic of Poland in the Free City of Gdańsk. During his term of office, he attained the rank of authorized minister (minister pełnomocny) and special envoy (poseł nadzwyczajny). His uncompromising attitude as General Commissioner united quarreling Polish organizations in Gdańsk. Polish policy toward the Gdańsk did not change under Chodacki, and policy was continuously marked by strong opposition to Nazification of the city. As Commissioner, Chodacki often intervened in the defense of Poles, whose health and lives were frequently endangered. During Chodacki's service as Commissioner, the work of Polish Intelligence was intensified and employees of the Commissariat collected information about the military preparations in Gdańsk.

In August 1939, Chodacki paid a customary visit to the battleship Schleswig-Holstein.

On September 1, 1939, Germans arrested Chodacki and other employees of the Polish Commissariat. As the result of protests by the previously expelled Carl Jacob Burckhardt, High Commissioner of the League of Nations in Gdańsk, the Germans released Chodacki and others over the Lithuanian border on September 5.

== Second World War and aftermath ==
During World War II, Chodacki was a soldier of the Polish Armed Forces in France and Great Britain. He was, however, quickly transferred to the Polish Consulate in New York City, and—on September 1, 1943—became the head of the secret Estezet service. In the final years of the war, he served as a Polish liaison officer within the ranks of the American Office of Strategic Services. After the war, Chodacki worked at the Józef Piłsudski Institute in New York City. He ultimately served as the institute's executive director from 1949 to 1951.

== Commemoration ==
On March 11, 2019, by decision number 491 of the Polish Minister of National Defense, Marian Chodacki was posthumously promoted to the rank of lieutenant colonel.

== Orders and awards ==
- Silver Cross of the Military Order of Virtuti Militari
- Independence Medal
- Cross of Valour (three times)
- Silver Cross of Merit
- Knight's Cross of the Légion d'honneur

== Works (Polish) ==
- Dzienniki Personalne Ministerstwa Spraw Wojskowych.
- Roczniki oficerskie 1923, 1924, 1928 i 1932.

== See also ==
- Free City of Gdańsk
