= Gałązka =

Gałązka is a Polish surname. Notable people with the surname include:

- Jacek Gałązka (1924–2018), Polish soldier and activist
- Jan Gałązka (1945–1982), Polish boxer
- Katarzyna Gałązka (born 1997), Polish actress
- Paulina Gałązka (born 1989), Polish actress
