= Lucjusz Kupferwasser =

Polish-American activist (1888–1983)

- Born: 1888; Lublin, Congress Poland
- Died: 1983 (aged 94–95); Chicago, United States
- Occupations: soldier, aviation mechanic, social activist

Lucjusz Kupferwasser (born in 1888 in Lublin, Congress Poland) was a Polish-American social activist and one of the founders of the Józef Piłsudski Institute of America.

== Early life ==
In 1905, he was expelled from school for his participation in the student strikes happening in the Russian Empire. In danger of being arrested, he immigrated to the United States in 1910, where he initially settled in Cleveland, Ohio. He was active in the Polish National Alliance and the Polish National Defense Committee and served as a financial secretary in the latter organization.

== On the front ==
When the United States joined the Entente in World War I, Kupferwasser volunteered for the American Army, in which he served as an aviation mechanic. He was strongly poisoned by chemical weapons on the Western Front. Upon his return to the United States, he moved back to Cleveland. In 1935, he moved to Chicago. He was active in the Polish Maritime and Colonial League as well as the American Polonia Council.

== World War II and aftermath ==
After the outbreak of World War II, Kupferwasser was one of the founders of the National Committee of Americans of Polish Extraction (KNAPP), of which he became one of directors in 1945. In July 1943, he was one of the founders of the Józef Piłsudski Institute of America and became a member of its board a year later, in October 1944. In 1978, he was named an honorific member of the institute. He was one of the most generous members of the institute, giving large donations on multiple occasions. He died in 1983 in Chicago.

== Bibliography ==
- (in Polish) Biogram Lucjusza Kupferwassera na stronie Instytutu Józefa Piłsudskiego w Ameryce
