= Henryk Floyar-Rajchman =

Polish statesman

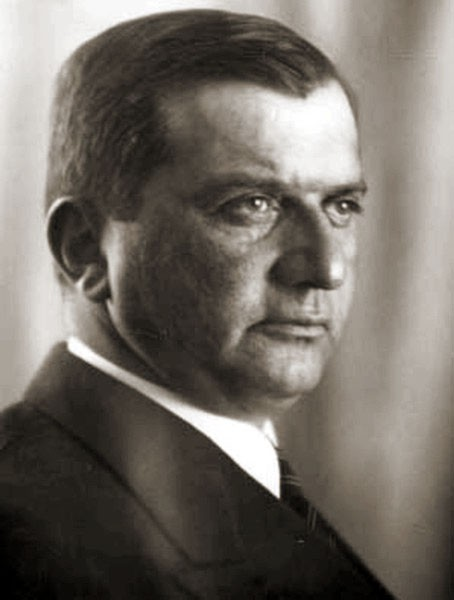
- Floyar-Rajchman in 1934

Minister of Trade and Industry
- In office May 15, 1934 – October 12, 1935
- President: Ignacy Mościcki
- Preceded by: Ferdynand Zarzycki
- Succeeded by: Roman Górecki

Personal details
- Born: December 7, 1893 Warsaw, Congress Poland, Russian Empire
- Died: March 22, 1951 (aged 57)
- Citizenship: Polish

Henryk Floyar-Rajchman (December 7, 1893 – March 22, 1951) was a Polish statesman and a founding member of the Józef Piłsudski Institute of America for Research in the Modern History of Poland created in New York City in July 1943.

== Early life ==
Born in Warsaw, Floyar-Rajchman was educated in his hometown and in Kraków. From 1913 on he belonged to the Riflemen's Association, a Polish paramilitary structure in Galicia. After the outbreak of the World War in 1914, Floyar-Rajchman served in the Fifth Infantry Regiment of the Polish Legions. In 1917, when the Legions refused to swear allegiance to the Central Powers, he joined the secret Polish Military Organization. He served as captain in the Polish–Bolshevik War of 1919–1920 as a staff officer in the First Legion Infantry Division.

== Interwar Period ==
In 1923 Floyar-Rajchman began education at the Higher War School in Warsaw, from which he obtained a diplomatic major rank. Between 1928 and 1931 he served as a military attaché in Japan, after which he became a representative in the Polish Sejm and served as the head of the Industrial Inspection Department. In 1933 he started working for the Ministry of Trade and Industry and advanced to serve as the minister between May 15, 1934, and October 12, 1935.

== World War II ==
During the September Campaign of 1939, Floyar-Rajchman participated in the mission to evacuate the Polish gold reserve via Romania and return it to the Polish government-in-exile. He finalized his order on January 29, 1940, and was moved to the reserves on March 12. Soon afterward he moved, first to London and then to Brazil, where his wife was staying. He arrived in New York City on June 19, 1941, and was employed as an industrial consultant by the National Light & Metal Craft Company in the following year. In 1945, he was hired by the Union Parts Mfg. Company, Inc. Both companies were owned by Ignacy Nurkiewicz, with whom Floyar-Rajchman worked to establish the General Assembly of the National Committee of Americans of Polish Extraction (KNAPP) and the Józef Piłsudski Institute of America. (Nurkiewicz would later become president of the institute.)

== Postwar Years ==
Floyar-Rajchman served as vice-president of the Institute between 1947 and 1951, until his death from a heart attack on March 22 of that year. He is buried in the Calvary Cemetery II in Queens, New York in the same tomb as Ignacy Matuszewski.

== Bibliography ==
- (in Polish) Biogram Henryka Floyara-Rajchmana na stronie Instytutu Józefa Piłsudskiego
