= Dziennik Polski (disambiguation) =

Dziennik Polski is a Polish newspaper established in 1945.

Dziennik Polski may also refer to:

- Dziennik Polski (London), now Tydzień Polski, a Polish-language newspaper for Polish immigrants, established in 1940
- Dziennik Polski, a Detroit, Michigan, newspaper published for many years by Franciszek Januszewski
