= Halina Janiszewska =

Polish activist

- Born: May 1, 1909; Vitkovice, Moravia
- Died: November 17, 2006 (aged 97); New York City, United States
- Occupations: scout, social activist, musician, historian

Halina Janiszewska (born Halina Maria Rogoyska on May 1, 1909, in Vitkovice, Moravia, died on November 17, 2006, in New York City) was a Polish social and political activist as well as a long-time member of the executive board of the Józef Piłsudski Institute of America.

== Life and activity ==
Halina Janiszewska was born on May 1, 1909, in Vitkovice in the Czech Moravia. She attended the University of Warsaw and graduated with a degree in English philology and history. She also finished the Royal Academy of Music in London. On September 4, 1939, Janiszewska was sent to protect the National Library in Warsaw as the leader of a fifteen-strong group of scouts.

On September 5, 1939, she left Warsaw for Romania with a group of Polish government officials, which included the Minister of Foreign Affairs, Józef Beck, and her brother, Damian Rogoyski. From Romania, Janiszewska went to France, where in November 1939 she was hired by the cabinet of the prime minister of the Polish government-in-exile. She moved together with the government to London shortly after the fall of France to the Nazis in 1940. In 1943, she began working for the Polish Ministry of Interior.

In the early 1950s, Janiszewska immigrated to the United States and settled in New York City. She was employed by, among others, the International Air Transport Association, Persons & Whittmore Inc., Elisabeth Arden Corp., and the Mount Sinai Hospital. Between 1964 and 1971, she worked for the Alfred Jurzykowski Foundation, later in its advisory committee.

For many years, Janiszewska was tied to the Józef Piłsudski Institute of America and was a member of its board from 1969 onward. Between 1992 and 2000, Janiszewska was a member of the Institute's executive board and eventually received the status of a lifelong member. In 2004, the Institute awarded her the order "Merentibus" given to those who have disinterestedly contributed to its development of the years.

On April 30, 1995, Janiszewska received a Knight's Cross of the Order of Polonia Restituta in the Consulate General of the Republic of Poland in New York. She died on November 17, 2006, in Forest Hills, New York City.

== Bibliography ==
- (in Polish) Zespół archiwalny nr 141 Instytutu Józefa Piłsudskiego w Ameryce
