= Janusz Cisek =

Polish historian (1955–2020)

Janusz Waldemar Cisek
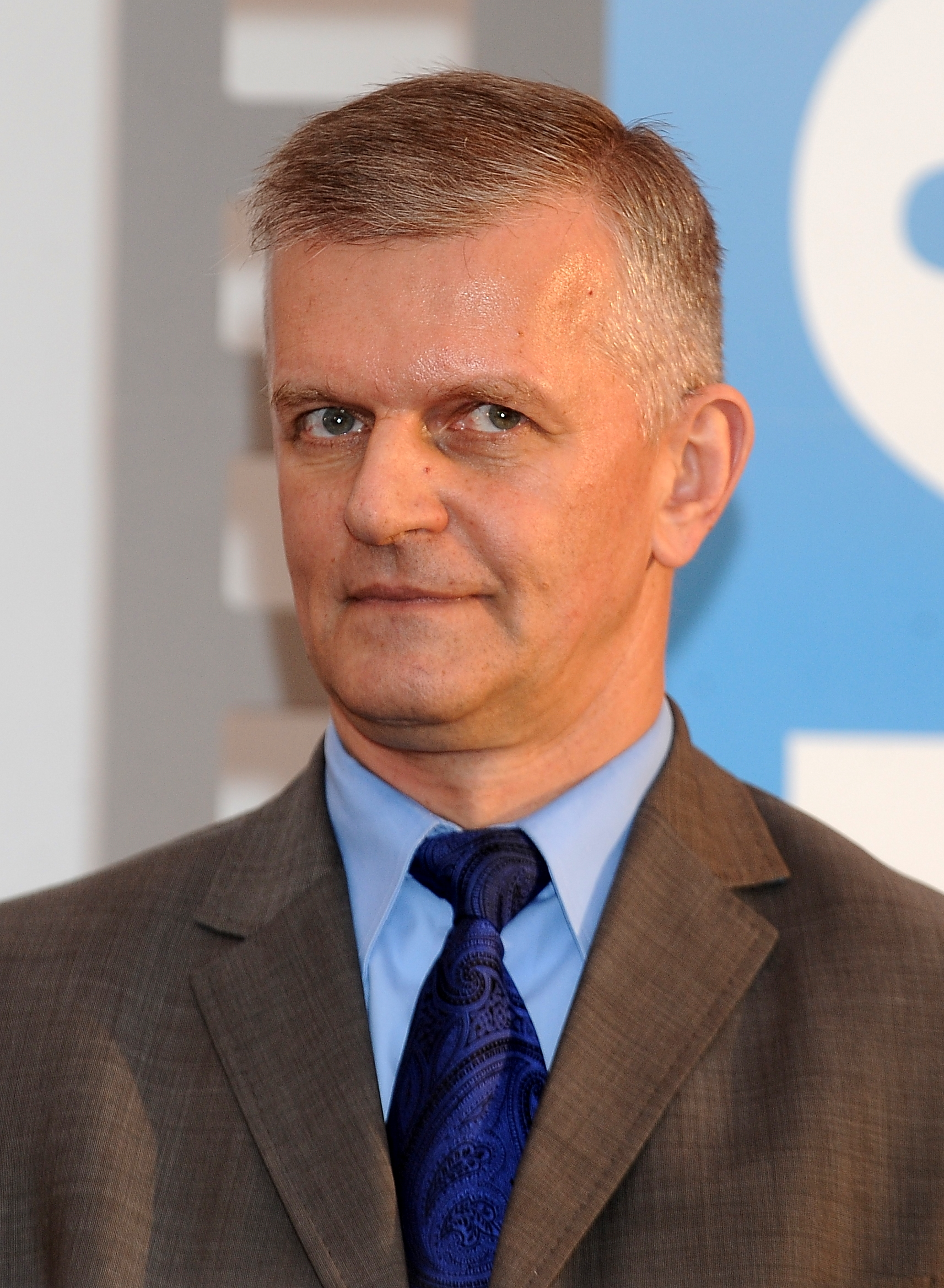

Under-Secretary of State of the Republic of Poland
- In office June 14, 2012 – April 24, 2013
- President: Bronisław Komorowski
- Prime Minister: Donald Tusk

Executive Director of the Józef Piłsudski Institute of America
- In office 1992–2000
- Preceded by: Jerzy Prus
- Succeeded by: Iwona Korga

Personal details
- Born: February 8, 1955 Stalowa Wola, Stalowa Wola County, Podkarpackie Voivodeship, Poland
- Died: February 28, 2020 (aged 65) Warsaw, Poland
- Citizenship: Polish
- Party: Polish Peasants' Party
- Occupation: Historian

Janusz Waldemar Cisek (February 8, 1955 – February 28, 2020) was a Polish historian, academic lecturer, director of the Pilsudski Institute and Polish Army Museum, from 2012 to 2013 Undersecretary of State in the Ministry of Foreign Affairs.

== Biography ==
A graduate of the High School National Education Commission in Stalowa Wola, in 1980 he graduated from history at the Jagiellonian University. In 1993 he obtained a doctoral degree in humanities at the University of Wrocław based on the work entitled General Belarusian Branches of General Stanisław Bułak-Bałachowicz in the policy of Józef Piłsudski during the Polish-Bolshevik war (March–December 1920). In 2003 he was habilitated at the same university. In 2013 he received the title of professor of humanities.

Initially, he worked in the Krakow archives. In 1986 he went to New York, worked at the Pilsudski Institute, serving as deputy director (1989–1992) and director (1992–2000) of this institution. After returning to Poland, he was the deputy department director at the Ministry of Culture (2001–2002) and vice president of Stalowa Wola (2002–2003). In 2006 he became the director of the Polish Army Museum, which he held until 2012. As an academic lecturer he was associated with the Jagiellonian University, where he became an associate professor at the Institute of European Studies. He also became the chief commander of the Strzelce Association of the Socio-Educational Organization (2008–2012), a member of the authorities of the Foundation of Former Soldiers of Special Forces GROM and a member of the Polish Scientific Society in Exile.

In January 2004, he received Kraków Book of the Month Award for the book Józef Piłsudski w Krakowie.

In the elections in 2011, he unsuccessfully ran for the Senate from the PSL. On 11 June 2012, he was appointed undersecretary of state in the Ministry of Foreign Affairs. On April 24, 2013, he was dismissed after resignation, which was motivated by health reasons – the need to undergo chemotherapy in connection with leukemia. On February 28, 2020, in the morning he died from Leukemia.

== Orders ==
In 2009, he was awarded the Officer's Cross of the Order of Polonia Restituta.

== Selected bibliography ==
- (in Polish) Kalendarium życia Józefa Piłsudskiego 1867–1935, tomy 1–4, LTW, Łomianki 2007
- (in Polish) Józef Piłsudski, Świat Książki, Warszawa 2007
- (in Polish) Do niepodległości (współautor z Markiem Ciskiem), Świat Książki, Warszawa 2008
