= Jan Fryling =

Polish diplomat, writer and journalist

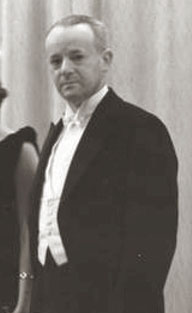

Eleventh President of the Józef Piłsudski Institute of America
- In office 1972 – March 3, 1977
- Preceded by: Wiesław Domaniewski
- Succeeded by: Wacław Jędrzejewicz

Sixth Executive Director of the Józef Piłsudski Institute of America
- In office 1962–1972
- Preceded by: Wacław Jędrzejewicz
- Succeeded by: Michał Budny

Poland Ambassador to China
- In office 1945–1949
- Preceded by: Alfred Poniński

Personal details
- Born: October 8, 1891 Lemberg, Austria-Hungary
- Died: March 3, 1977 (aged 85) New York City
- Resting place: Maple Grove Cemetery; Kew Gardens, New York

Jan Fryling (October 8, 1891, in Lemberg – March 3, 1977, in New York City) was a Polish diplomat, writer, journalist and president of the Józef Piłsudski Institute of America in the years 1972–1977.

== Biography ==
He completed his elementary education at the III Gimnazjum in Lemberg and pursued higher education in his hometown as well as in Munich. He published poetry before World War I. In 1913, he first recited his well-known and widely reprinted poem O, karabinie mój (O, my rifle). He served in the Polish Legions during the Great War.

In 1918, he was an editor of the magazine Nowa Gazeta and worked on his law residency at the Appeal Court in Warsaw. In November of that year, he also held a position at the Ministry of Religion and Public Enlightenment. In 1921, he defended his doctoral thesis in law at the Jan Kazimierz University in Lwów. In 1922, he served as a bureaucrat at the Ministry of Foreign Affairs. Later, he was responsible for the sections concerning the League of Nations and East-Central Europe and the Balkans.

He wrote play reviews for the French-language Warsaw publication Messager Polonais. From 1927-1930, he worked for the Polish diplomatic mission in Tokyo (serving as chargé d'affaire ad interim between April and October 1930). After his return to Poland, he once again worked for the Foreign Ministry and simultaneously, between 1932 and 1936, as a lecturer of diplomacy at the Jan Kazimierz University in Lwów and at the Wyższa Szkoła Wojenna (Higher Military School) in Warsaw.

Following the outbreak of World War II, he found himself in self-imposed exile in Romania. Between September 1939 and October 1940, he worked for the Polish consulate in Chernivtsi and later in Suceava. Subsequently, he spent some time in exile in Jerusalem. In May 1941, he became director of the Polish radio Kair, for which he wrote and edited broadcasts. In November 1943, he moved to China as an adviser to the Polish diplomatic mission in that country. He headed that mission between April 1945 and 1949 as a delegate of the Polish government-in-exile. In April 1949, he set out for India, where he was an unofficial envoy of the government-in-exile in Calcutta until 1956.

He moved to the United States in 1956. In October of that year, he was employed by the New York chapter of the Radio Free Europe, for which he would prepare theater and book reviews. In March 1957, he began editing publications for the Józef Piłsudski Institute of America. In 1964, he became executive director of the Institute and served as its president between 1972 and his death in 1977. He was a member of the jury of the literary prize given by the London Wiadomości (1972-1977), for which he had published before. In 1973-77, he also directed the Prize Committee of the Alfred Jurzykowski Foundation.

Fryling published several volumes of memoirs: Złote litery, srebrne litery (1974), W osiemdziesięciu latach naokoło świata (1978).

He received a prize from the Association of Polish Emigre Authors (Związek Pisarzy Polskich na Obczyźnie (1974)) and was awarded several Polish orders and decorations: Commander's Cross of the Order of Polonia Restituta, Order of the White Lion (IV class), Order of St. Sava, Order of the Crown of Romania (VII class) and the Legion of Honour (V class).

Fryling is buried at the Maple Grove Cemetery in Kew Gardens, New York.

== Bibliography (in Polish) ==
- Bolesław Klimaszewski, Ewa R. Nowakowska, Wojciech Wyskiel Mały słownik pisarzy polskich na obczyźnie, 1939–1980, wyd. 1992
- Konrad Tatarowski Literatura i pisarze w programie Rozgłośni Polskiej Radia Wolna Europa, wyd. 2006
- Słownik Biograficzny Polskiej Służby Zagranicznej 1918-1945. Tom III, Wyd. Ministerstwo Spraw Zagranicznych. Warszawa 2007
- Biogram Jana Frylinga na stronie Instytutu Józefa Piłsudskiego w Ameryce
- Jarosław Jędrzejczak Mówi Polskie Rado Kair w: Archiwum Emigracji. Studia. Szkice. Dokumenty, rok 2001, zeszyt 4
