= National Committee of Americans of Polish Extraction =

Polish-American organization, 1942–59

- Polish: Komitet Narodowy Amerykanów Polskiego Pochodzenia
- Formation: June 20–21, 1942
- Dissolved: 1959
- Purpose: Defending Polish independence and territorial integrity in the aftermath of World War II
- Official language: English, Polish
- Key people: Wacław Jędrzejewicz, Ignacy Matuszewski, Henryk Floyar-Rajchman, Bolesław Wieniawa-Długoszowski
- Parent organization: Polish American Congress (uniting in 1944)

National Committee of Americans of Polish Extraction, (Polish: Komitet Narodowy Amerykanów Polskiego Pochodzenia or KNAPP)also known as the National Committee of Americans of Polish Descent or its Polish abbreviation KNAPP, was a Polish-American organization active in the years 1942-1959 in the United States.

KNAPP was created in 1942 by Polish activists in the United States to lobby for Poland's independence during World War II. The organization viewed Stalin as a threat to Poland, and campaigned against British and American politicians as they made concessions giving Poland to the Soviet Union. Many Polish Americans joined the cause of the KNAPP and other Polonia organizations during World War II; the group's membership and public visibility peaked in 1944. In 1944, KNAPP started a nationwide Polish American Congress to assemble Polish American leaders for an annual meeting in Buffalo, New York.

Following the Yalta Agreement, KNAPP issued messages to its supporters in outrage that the Allies had not honored Poland's pre-war borders and effectively handed Poland to the USSR. The organization continued in the postwar years lobbying American politicians to raise awareness of atrocities committed against Poles in the Soviet Union.

== History ==
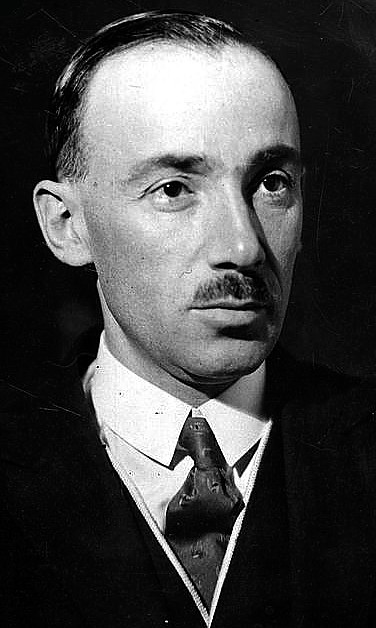
Wacław Jędrzejewicz

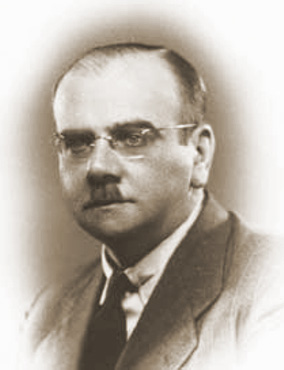
Ignacy Matuszewski

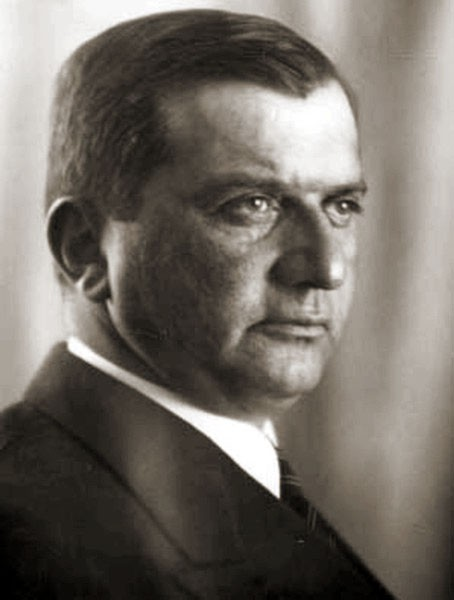
Henryk Floyar-Rajchman

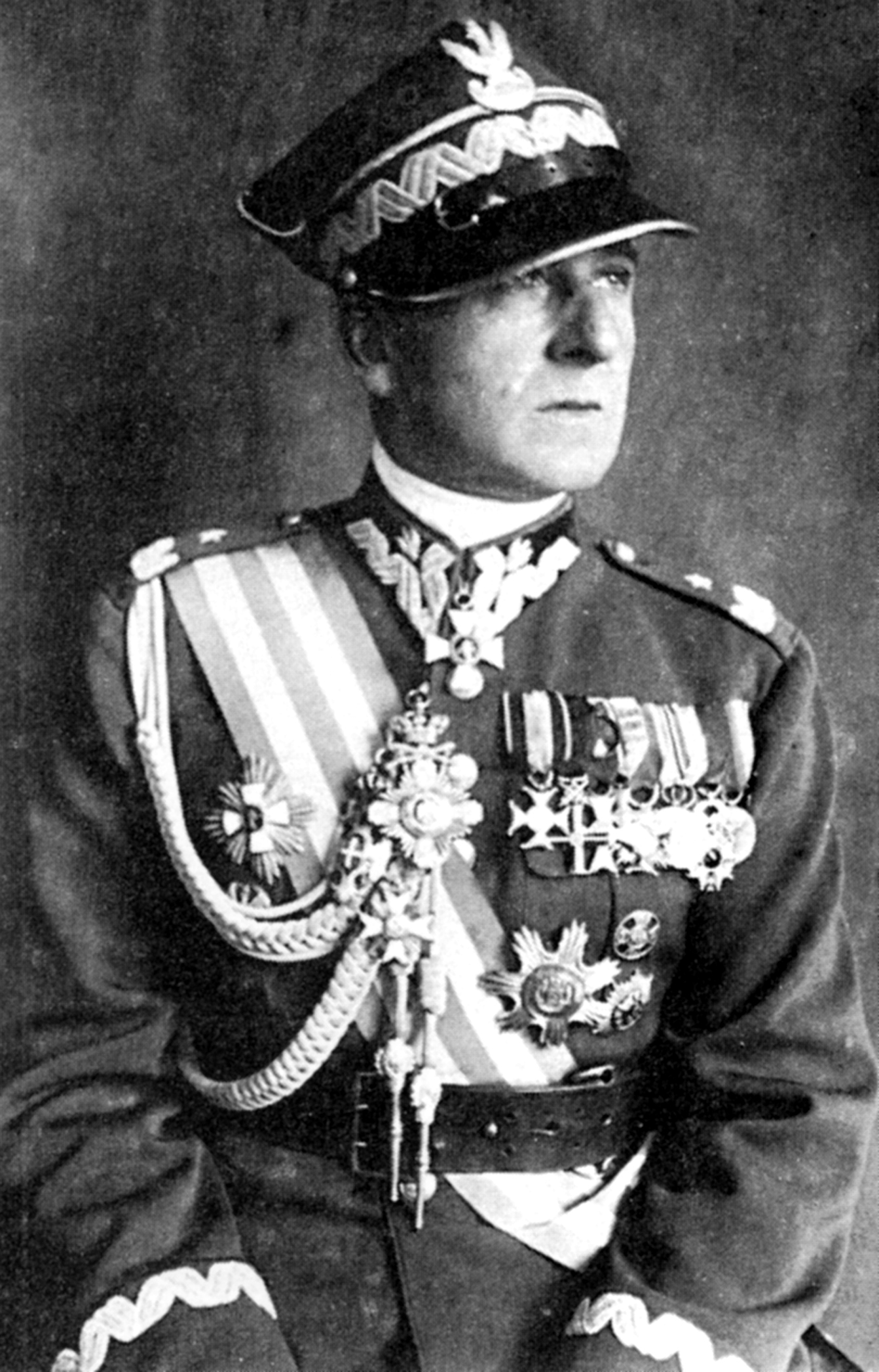
Bolesław Wieniawa-Długoszowski

The National Committee of Americans of Polish Extraction (NCAPE) was created on June 20–21, 1942 on the initiative of several Piłsudskiites, followers of the late Marshal Józef Piłsudski. Individuals associated with the Committee accused the Polish government-in-exile of compromising policies toward the Soviet Union and naiveté toward the attitude of the Western Allies regarding the Polish question.

The NCAPE aimed to defend Polish interests, especially the independence and territorial integrity of the prewar Republic, as well as to lobby for the implementing of the Atlantic Charter and the conditions of the Polish-British Alliance of August 28, 1939. The activists of the Committee thought that Poland's right to an independent existence were threatened not only directly by the occupants, Nazi Germany and the Soviet Union, but also indirectly by the irresponsible and cynical diplomatic games of Great Britain and the United States. In their opinion, these Western powers were willing to pay any price to preserve their alliance with Stalin, which they thought fundamental to defeating the Third Reich.

Among the founders of the NCAPE were Wacław Jędrzejewicz, Ignacy Matuszewski, Henryk Floyar-Rajchman and Bolesław Wieniawa-Długoszowski. They decided to leave Europe for the United States after the defeat of France in 1940. In America, they saw a potential ally for Poland and the crucial geopolitical player in forging the European peace in the future. Consequently, the founders of the Committee established contacts with the Polish-American Piłsudskiites.

The activity of the NCAPE found little understanding in the circles of the Roosevelt administration, but its biggest enemies were the communists living in the United States who proclaimed themselves to be representatives of the entire American Polonia.

Such opposition to the NCAPE stemmed from the sociopolitical atmosphere in the United States, which resulted from the meticulous work of the Soviet intelligence rezident. Soviet agents had since the 1930s seized control of a large section of intellectual, cultural and scientific life in America so that on the eve of the Second World War they were able to influence the federal government and the directions of American foreign policy. The work of Soviet Intelligence in the United States was supervised by Vasily Zarubin, the infamous officer of the NKWD connected to the Katyn Massacre (screened the Polish officers at the Kozelsk camp in terms of their utility to the Soviet Union). In consequence, the Committee was subject to systematic attacks in the press and on the political forum.

The NCAPE signaled the need to create a central political organization for the American Polonia, which had not existed until that point. Behind the initiative was the idea that only the citizens of the United States are eligible to vote in the American elections and can influence Washington. The Committee was joined in its efforts to create a political organization by the editors and publishers of newspapers: Maksymilian Węgrzynek in New York and Franciszek Januszewski in Detroit. Both dailies attracted the readership of members of Polish-American organizations, notably that of the three largest: Polish National Alliance (Związek Narodowy Polski), Zjednoczenie Polskie Rzymsko-Katolickie i Związek Polek w Ameryce with the headquarters in Chicago.

== Consolidation ==
Polish immigrant mutual assistance associations reached the conclusion that they needed to consolidate in the defense of Poland. Their leaders found a common language with the NCAPE and established the Polish American Congress during the great Polonian conference in Buffalo in June 1944, attended by two thousand and five hundred delegates from different parts of the United States.

The task of this new organization was to influence the government of the United States to conduct policies beneficial to the Polish nation and to persuade the public opinion that Polish independence was compatible with the American raison d'être. The American-born (Wilkes Barre, Pennsylvania) Karol Rozmarek was elected president of the Polish-American Congress. Rozmarek had been the first American-born president of the largest Polish-American immigrant organization, the Polish National Alliance since 1939.

Given the political atmosphere in America, the postulates of the American Polonia were perceived as harmful to the war effort by the Roosevelt administration. Soon after the conference in Buffalo, Rozmarek initiated efforts to obtain an audience with President Roosevelt, but was declined multiple times. Only in October 1944, amid the upcoming presidential election during which Roosevelt was running for the unprecedented fourth term, was the Polish American Congress invited to visit the White House. A large map of the Second Polish Republic with the 1939 borders, hung behind the president's desk, was to suggest that Roosevelt accepted the old eastern frontier of Poland. The photograph of Rozmarek and Roosevelt in front of the map circulated the American press. Rozmarek supported Roosevelt's campaign and the Poles eligible to vote in the United States followed in the election of November 1944. Nevertheless, when the decisions of the Yalta Agreement became clear in February 1945 and so did Roosevelt's participation in the conference, the Polish support for the president as well as for Rozmarek drastically declined.

The main accomplishment of the NCAPE was the consolidation of Polish immigrant organizations in the United States and the consequent creation of the Polish American Congress. Its delegates also attended the Polish-American conference in San Francisco in 1945. The circle around the Committee organized the Józef Piłsudski Institute of America and undertook literary and scientific activity after the war.

The organization was dissolved in 1959.

== Bibliography ==
- (in Polish) Władysław Zachariasiewicz, Etos niepodległościowy Polonii amerykańskiej, Oficyna Wydawnicza Rytm - Stowarzyszenie "Wspólnota Polska", 2005 r., ISBN 83-7399-138-7
- (in Polish) Wacław Jędrzejewicz, Polonia amerykańska w polityce polskiej. Historia Komitetu Narodowego Amerykanów Pochodzenia Polskiego, Wydawn. LTW, Łomianki 2006 r.
