= Henryk Korab-Janiewicz =

Fifth President of the Józef Piłsudski Institute of America
- In office 1955–1961
- Preceded by: Ignacy Nurkiewicz
- Succeeded by: Władysław Bortnowski

Seventh President of the Józef Piłsudski Institute of America
- In office 1962–1965
- Preceded by: Władysław Bortnowski
- Succeeded by: Ignacy Nurkiewicz

Ninth President of the Józef Piłsudski Institute of America
- In office 1966–1969
- Preceded by: Ignacy Nurkiewicz
- Succeeded by: Wiesław Domaniewski

Personal details
- Born: January 16, 1897 Warsaw, Congress Poland
- Died: August 11, 1971 (aged 74) Short Hills, New Jersey, United States

Henryk Korab-Janiewicz (January 16, 1897 – August 11, 1971) was a Polish-American businessman, historian, social activist and three-time president of the Józef Piłsudski Institute of America.

== Life and activity ==
He was born on January 16, 1897, in Warsaw. In 1911, he became active in scouting and in the Riflemen's Association. In 1915, he was arrested by the Russians and transported deep east into Russia. Returned to Poland in 1919 and received a recommendation to enroll in a military trade school. Next, Korab-Janiewicz finished the Wyższa Szkoła Handlowa in Warsaw and worked as the chairman of the International Association of Trade and Consignment "Metokko" as well as in the Polish State Loan Agency.

In 1924 he moved to Paris, where he studied and worked as one of secretaries general for the Association for Protection of Polish Immigrants in France. In 1928 he moved to the United States and settled in the state of New Jersey, where he launched the Ampol Film Co. and worked for the editing staff of the daily "Dziennik dla Wszystkich". In 1935, Korab-Janiewicz established a factory of meat products called "Pasco" and initiated the creation of a Buffalo branch of the Polish Maritime and Colonial League.

In 1940 he was elected as the president of the American Polonia Council in New Jersey. In 1947 he became a member of the Józef Piłsudski Institute of America and between 1955 and 1969 he served as its president, with two short breaks. On September 26, 1962, he was granted honorary membership of the Institute. Korab-Janiewicz died in Short Hills, New Jersey on August 11, 1971.

=== Bibliography ===
- (in Polish) Biogram Henryka Koraba-Janiewicza na stronie Instytutu Józefa Piłsudskiego w Ameryce
