= Maksymilian Węgrzynek =

American publisher

- Born: 1892; Rudnik nad Sanem, Galicia
- Died: November 8, 1944 (aged 51–52); New York City, New York, United States
- Occupations: publisher, social activist

Maksymilian Węgrzynek (1892 – November 8, 1944) was a Polish-American publisher (Nowy Świat), social activist as well as one of the founders of the Józef Piłsudski Institute of America and the Polish American Congress. He also served as president of the National Committee of Americans of Polish Extraction (KNAPP).

== Early years ==
He created a division of the Riflemen's Association in Rudnik. On May 14, 1914, he arrived at New York City with 35 cents. Being an Austrian subject, he did not receive a permission to leave the United States to join the Polish Legions in World War I. He studied at Columbia University and finished City College in 1917. After World War I, he worked for Telegram Codzienny as well as the American Advertising Federation. In 1922, he became a publisher and in 1925 president of a house publishing the Polish-American newspaper Nowy Świat.

== Business Activity ==
In 1932, Węgrzynek started the New York-based Am-Pol Inc. Company that imported products from Poland. In 1936, his enterprise's annual trade traffic was 3.5 million, which ranked it high in the minds of New York's businessmen.

== Social Activism ==
He was active in the Polish-American Community, collecting money for, among others, the Polish National Defense Fund. He was vice-president of the Kościuszko Foundation. Following the outbreak of World War II, he worked for the cause of defending Polish independence. He was one of the founders and the first president of the National Committee of Americans of Polish Extraction (KNAPP) (1942) and was also one of the founders of the Józef Piłsudski Institute of America. In 1944, during the organizational assembly, he was elected vice-president of the Polish American Congress.

== Political views ==
Węgrzynek was a critic of the policies of General Władysław Sikorski and Stanisław Mikołajczyk. He died on November 8, 1944, in New York City.

== Bibliography ==
- (in Polish) Biogram Maksymiliana Węgrzynka na stronie Instytutu Józefa Piłsudskiego w Ameryce
