= Wiesław Domaniewski =

Polish businessman and economist

Tenth President of the Józef Piłsudski Institute of America
- In office 28 March 1969 – 17 March 1972
- Preceded by: Henryk Korab-Janiewicz
- Succeeded by: Jan Fryling

Personal details
- Born: 2 January 1896 Warsaw, Congress Poland
- Died: 29 October 1992 (aged 96)
- Resting place: Montmorency, Val-d'Oise, France

Wiesław Domaniewski (2 January 1896 – 29 October 1992) was a Polish businessman, financial adviser and economist, as well as one of the founders of the association Polish Veterans of World War II. He served as president of the Józef Piłsudski Institute of America in the years 1969–1972.

== Life ==
He was born on 2 January 1896 in Warsaw, then Congress Poland. Between 1918 and 1920, he served in the Polish Army, participating in the clashes in Volhynia, among others. In 1921, he graduated from the Department of Law and Political Science of the University of Warsaw. In the years 1921–1922, he worked in the Warsaw office of the Industrialists' Association of Bielsko-Biała.

He studied in Berlin and Paris. After his return to Poland in 1927, he became an investigator at the Surveying Commission for Research of Production and Trading Conditions at the prime minister's cabinet, only to soon advance to become the head of the Economical Bureau. In the period 1932–1933, he was a financial adviser to the Polish Embassy in Paris and subsequently the director of the Department of Transactions at the Ministry of Treasury.

In July 1939, he was named vice-president of the Bank Gospodarstwa Krajowego. Following the outbreak of World War II in September 1939, he participated in the operation of saving the assets of the Polish Bank (Bank Polski Spółka Akcyjna) alongside General Roman Górecki. In February 1943, he became the main economic adviser of the Polish government-in-exile at its Washington embassy. After the war, he settled in New York City and worked for the firm Roehr Products Co. with headquarters in Waterbury, Connecticut.

He was one of the founders of the association Polish Veterans of World War II. A member of the Józef Piłsudski Institute of America starting in 1948, he served as its treasurer starting in 1955, with short breaks. During the period 28 March 1969 – 17 March 1972 he was president of the Institute.

Domaniewski died on 29 October 1992, aged 96. He is buried in the cemetery in Montmorency, Val-d'Oise, near Paris.

== Bibliography ==
- (in Polish) Biogram Wiesława Domaniewskiego na stronie Instytutu Józefa Piłsudskiego w Ameryce
