= Damian Stanisław Wandycz =

Polish-American activist (1892–1974)

Executive Director of the Józef Piłsudski Institute of America
- In office 1951–1956
- Preceded by: Marian Chodacki
- Succeeded by: Wincenty Kowalski

Personal details
- Born: January 2, 1892 Dobrzyń
- Died: May 12, 1974 (aged 82)

Damian Stanisław Wandycz (January 2, 1892 (Dobrzyń) – May 12, 1974) was a Polish-American émigré social and political activist, engineer, chemist, as well as a petroleum and natural gas industrialist. He served as a member of the municipal council of the Polish city of Lwów before World War II as well as Executive Director of the Józef Piłsudski Institute of America in the years 1951–1956.

== Biography ==
He studied at the polytechnics of Prague and Warsaw. During World War I fought with the I Brigade of the Polish Legions. In 1918 a member of the Polish diplomatic mission to Czechoslovakia.

In 1923, Wandycz became the director of a Polish petroleum-exporting company. During World War II worked for the Polish government-in-exile. Sent to the United States with the mission of negotiating an American loan for Poland, remained in America.

In 1965–1969, director of the Polish Institute of Arts and Sciences of America. In 1951–1956 executive director of the Józef Piłsudski Institute of America. Also an organizer of the first Congress of American Scholars of Polish Extraction.

Damian Stanisław Wandycz was survived by his son Piotr Wandycz, a Polish-American historian.

== Orders ==
Wandycz received, among others, the Cross for Loyal Service to the I Brigade (Krzyż za Wierną Służbę I Brygady), the Cross of Independence (Krzyż Niepodległości) and the Gold Cross of Merit (Złoty Krzyż Zasługi).

== Selected publications ==
- (in Polish) Technologia mydła w zarysie, Kraków: S. A. Krzyżanowski 1919.
- (in Polish) Uwagi o sytuacji ogólnej przemysłu naftowego : streszczenie referatu wygłoszonego na Posiedzeniu Komisji Międzyministerjalnej, w dniu 21 stycznia 1936 r. we Lwowie, Lwów 1936.
- (in Polish) L. Nauwelaerts, Nafta potęga ziemi, z upoważ. aut. przeł. Karol Zagajewski; rozdz. 16 pt.: Polska napisał Damian Wandycz, Lwów: "Książnica-Atlas" 1938.
- (in Polish) Samowystarczalność naftowa : referat wygłoszony na 10 Zjeździe Naftowym we Lwowie, dn. 28 maja 1938 r., Lwów 1938.
- (in Polish) Zapomniany list Piłsudskiego do Masaryka, London: Instytut Józefa Piłsudskiego w Ameryce 1953.
- (in English) (editor) Register of Polish American scholars, scientists, writers & artists, ed. by Damian S. Wandycz, New York: The Pol. Inst. of Arts and Sciences in America 1969.
- (in English) (editor) Studies in Polish civilization. Selected papers presented at the 1. Congress of the Polish Institute of Arts and Sciences in America, November 25, 26, 27, 1966 in New York, ed. by Damian S. Wandycz, New York: Institute on East Central Europe: Columbia Univ.; Polish Institute of Arts and Sciences in America 1971.
- (in Polish) Polski Instytut Naukowy w Ameryce : w trzydziestą rocznicę 1942–1972, Nowy Jork: Polski Instytut Naukowy 1974.

== Bibliography ==
- (in Polish) Polski Instytut Naukowy w Ameryce : w trzydziestą rocznicę 1942–1972, New York: Polski Instytut Naukowy 1974.
