= Andrzej Beck =

Polish-American engineer and businessman (1926–2011)

Fifteenth president of the Józef Piłsudski Institute of America
- In office 1993–1999
- Preceded by: Stanisław Jordanowski
- Succeeded by: Jacek M. Gałązka
- Born: September 11, 1926
- Died: July 20, 2011 (aged 84)
- Father: Józef Beck

Andrzej Beck (September 11, 1926 – July 20, 2011), also known as Andrew J. Beck, was a Polish-American engineer and businessman. He served as president of the Józef Piłsudski Institute of America (1993–1999). He was the son of the interwar Polish foreign minister Józef Beck.

== Life ==
Beck was born on September 11, 1926, to the foreign minister of the Second Polish Republic, Józef Beck, and his wife, Maria Słomińska. At the outbreak of World War II, his mother and he left for the United States via Romania, Italy, France and Portugal. A graduate of an officer cadets' school in Scotland in 1945, he was a soldier in the 4th regiment of the anti-tank artillery of the Polish Armed Forces in the West.

He finished an engineering major at Rutgers University, New Jersey. He worked as engineer at Waterbury Farrel (from 1958), business director and vice-president. In 1983, Beck established his own firm, Eastport Trading, in Cheshire, Connecticut. He was a member of the executive board of the Józef Piłsudski Institute of America between 1967 and 1972 and in the years 1988–2009. He served as the Institute's president between 1993 and 1999, and was vice-president afterward.

He married Ewa Jedrzejewicz. Beck died on July 20, 2011, in Fairfield, Connecticut.
