= Franciszek Januszewski =

Polish-American activist (1886–1953)

First President of the Józef Piłsudski Institute of America
- In office 1943–1944
- Succeeded by: Stefan Łodzieski

Third President of the Józef Piłsudski Institute of America
- In office 1951–1953
- Succeeded by: Ignacy Nurkiewicz

Personal details
- Born: November 23, 1886 Łomża, Congress Poland
- Died: June 10, 1953 Ann Arbor, Michigan, USA
- Resting place: Detroit, Michigan, USA

Franciszek Januszewski (November 23, 1886 – June 10, 1953) was a Polish-American social activist and the publisher of Detroit's Dziennik Polski. He was also one of the founders of the Józef Piłsudski Institute of America and its president twice (1943–44 and 1951–53).

== Before World War II ==
Born on November 23, 1886, in Łomża, Januszewski became active in the Polish Socialist Party in 1905 and, fearing arrest, had to immigrate to the United States two years later. He joined the local "Sokół" club in Cleveland, Ohio, where he finished the Business College. In 1912, he moved to Detroit and became active in the Polish National Defense Committee in Chicago. In 1913. Januszewski started working for Dziennik Polski in Detroit as an advertising agent. He eventually became the owner of the journal in 1930 and largely contributed to its expansion.

== Social Activism ==
After the outbreak of World War II, he worked for the cause of Polish independence. He was one of the initiators of New York's Józef Piłsudski Polish National Defense Committee (1942). He served as vice-president and president of the National Committee of Americans of Polish Extraction (KNAPP) until 1946. He co-organized and led the Organizational Committee of the Józef Piłsudski Institute of America and became the first president of the Institute, serving in 1943–1944. Elected president once again in 1951, he fulfilled the function until his sudden death two years later on June 10, 1953.

== Bibliography ==
- (in Polish) Biogram Franciszka Januszewskiego na stronie Instytutu Józefa Piłsudskiego
