= Janusz K. Zawodny =

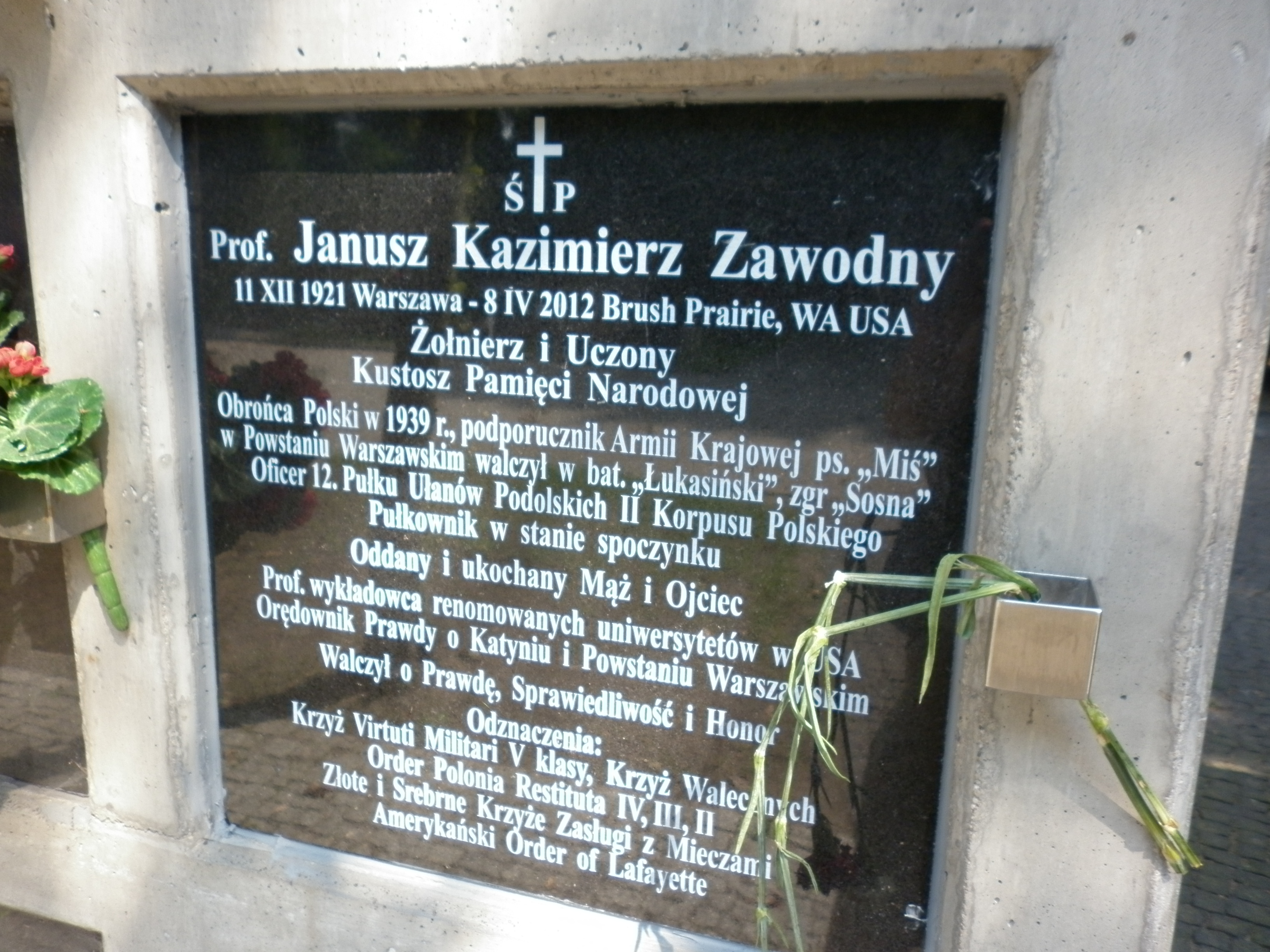
- Grave marker of Janusz Kazimierz Zawodny at the Powazki Military Cemetery in 2012.
- Born: 11 December 1921; Warsaw, Poland
- Died: 8 April 2012 (aged 90); Brush Prairie, Washington, U.S.
- Occupations: Soldier, freedom fighter, university professor, historian, writer, political scientist

Janusz Kazimierz Zawodny (11 December 1921 – 8 April 2012) was a Polish-American historian, political scientist, and World War II soldier and resistance fighter of the Polish Underground State.

== Life ==
Zawodny fought in the Polish Army during World War II, initially during the Invasion of Poland, then with the underground Home Army resistance movement. He took part as a second lieutenant in the 1944 Warsaw Uprising during the September campaign, first a soldier of the ZWZ (Związek Walki Zbrojnej), then the AK (Armia Krajowa). In the Warsaw Uprising he was a platoon commander of a battalion AK "Lukasiriski", and later replaced the commander of the companies "Cost" in the group the "Pine" at the Old Town. In the street fighting against Waffen-SS troops, he was twice wounded: once in the hand by submachine gun fire at point-blank range, and once to his face and ear by schrapnel after he recovered, and threw back, a live German grenade that was tossed into the bunker he and his men were sheltering in. After the uprising, he was captured and became a prisoner of war in Oflag VII-A Murnau under a different name, "Turczyk", as he was wanted by the Gestapo beginning in April 1944. After liberation from Murnau, he joined the Second Polish Army Corps in Italy, where he commanded a battalion of heavy armored cars in the 12th Podolian Uhlan Regiment.

After the war (1945–48), he continued his military service with Polish Second Corps. When the Soviet Union took control of the country, creating the People's Republic of Poland, he decided to stay abroad and emigrated to the United States, ultimately residing in Washington state until his death in 2012.

He studied at the University of Iowa and earned his PhD in 1955 at Stanford University. He went on to teach at Princeton University, University of Pennsylvania, St Antony's College (Oxford University), Claremont Graduate University and Pomona College.

He was a member of the Institute for Advanced Study Princeton (1971–72); Research Associate, Harvard University Center for International Affairs (1968); Fellow, Center for Advanced Study in the Behavioral Sciences, Stanford (1961–62); Fellow (Faculty), Ford Foundation (1956, 1958–59, 1968–69); Fellow, Institute for Social & Behavioral Pathology, University of Chicago; Consultant, Institute for Foreign Policy Analysis, The Fletcher School of Law & Diplomacy, Tufts University, Cambridge.

He also served as an advisor to the National Security Council (1979–84) for the Carter and Reagan presidential administrations.

== Books ==
- Death in the Forest: The Story of the Katyn Forest Massacre (1962)
- Nothing but Honor: The Story of the Warsaw Uprising, 1944 (1978)
- Man and International Relations: Contribution of the Social Sciences to the Study of Conflict and Integration (1967), Editor and Contributor.
- Guide to the Study of International Relations (1966)
- The Warsaw Uprising in Combat and Diplomacy (1994)
- Participants and Witnesses of the Warsaw Uprising. Interviews (2004)
- Motyl na Śniegu (Butterfly in the Snow) (2004)

== Awards ==
- History Award, The J. Pilsudski Institute, New York, 1997
- Literary Award, Kultura, Paris 1981
- Gold Medal and Life Membership, Medicus Association Doctors of Medicine, for "Interdisciplinary Research," New York, 1980
- 2003 laureate honor "Guardian of National Remembrance" from Poland's Instytut Pamięci Narodowej

== Decorations ==
- Virtuti Militari
- Polonia Restituta (Commander with Star) by President Aleksander Kwaśniewski on 6 September 1996 "in recognition of outstanding merit in activities for Poland"
- Order of Merit of the Republic of Poland (Commander with Star) from President Lech Wałęsa on 9 March 1994 "for outstanding merit in journalism"
- Cross of Valor
- Gold and Silver Crosses of Merit with Swords
- British War Medal 1939–45.

== See also ==
- List of Poles
