= Ignacy Nurkiewicz =

Fourth President of the Józef Piłsudski Institute of America
- In office 1954–1955
- Preceded by: Franciszek Januszewski
- Succeeded by: Henryk Korab-Janiewicz

Eighth President of the Józef Piłsudski Institute of America
- In office 1965–1966
- Preceded by: Henryk Korab-Janiewicz
- Succeeded by: Henryk Korab-Janiewicz

Personal details
- Born: November 2, 1887 Poland
- Died: September 16, 1972 (aged 84) Monmouth Junction, New Jersey, United States

Ignacy Nurkiewicz (November 2, 1887 – September 16, 1972) was a Polish engineer, a member of the Polish American Congress, as well as two-time president and one of the founders of the Józef Piłsudski Institute of America.

== Biography ==
Nurkiewicz was born on November 2, 1887, in Poland. In 1900, he came to the United States and settled in Brooklyn. He finished engineering at the Pratt Institute in New York. In 1920, he started a factory of metal products, especially extinguishers, which was eventually turned into one of the biggest firms of this type (Stop Fire) in the United States.

He was active in many Polish-American organizations. Among others, he served as vice-president of the committee lobbying to move the King Jagiełło Monument from the Polish Pavilion of the 1939 New York World's Fair to Central Park, New York City. In 1942, he took part in the assembly of the Józef Piłsudski Polish Defense Alliance.

In 1943, he was one of the founders of the Józef Piłsudski Institute of America, after which he worked for the Polish American Congress, where he was responsible for immigrant affairs (worked much for the benefit of the so-called "Displaced Persons" in Germany).

In the years 1949–51 he was the treasurer of the Piłsudski Institute. In 1954 he was named Marshal of the Pułaski Parade. In 1954–1955, he served as president of the institute. Next, he became its vice-president (1963–1964), treasurer (1964–1965) and president once again (1965–1966).

Nurkiewicz died on September 16, 1972, in Monmouth Junction, New Jersey.

== Bibliography ==
- (in Polish) Biogram Ignacego Nurkiewicza na stronie Instytutu Józefa Piłsudskiego w Ameryce
