= Iwona Korga =

Polish-American historian, archivist and educator

Iwona Drąg-Korga
- Education: Pedagogical University of Cracow; Queens College (CUNY)
- Occupations: Historian, archivist, educator
- Known for: President of the Józef Piłsudski Institute of America
- Term: 2016–present
- Awards: Order of Merit of the Republic of Poland Medal of the Centennial of Regained Independence Medal of the National Education Commission

Iwona Drąg-Korga (born July, 1967) is a Polish-American historian, archivist, educator, and the current President and Executive Director of the Józef Piłsudski Institute of America.

== Life ==
Iwona Drąg-Korga has lived in New York City since 1991.

She has been associated with the Józef Piłsudski Institute of America since 1995, first as a librarian and archivist, subsequently as deputy director, from 2005 as executive director, and since 2016 as president.

In 1991 she received a degree in history from the Pedagogical University of Kraków, and in 2004 a doctorate in humanities.

In 2008 she obtained a master's degree in information science and library science from Queens College, City University of New York.

Korga serves on the board of directors of the Polish & Slavic Federal Credit Union.

== Works ==
In 2011 Korga published Poland Is Fighting!, a book discussing the World War II propaganda policies of the Polish Government-in-Exile toward American society.

== Honors ==
In 2018 Korga received the Officer's Cross of the Order of Merit of the Republic of Poland from the President of Poland during a special ceremony at the Presidential Palace in Warsaw.

She was also awarded the Medal of the Centennial of Regained Independence and the Medal of the National Education Commission.

== See also ==
- List of Poles
