= Jacek Gałązka =

Polish Military Personnel

Jacek M. Gałązka

Sixteenth President of the Józef Piłsudski Institute of America
- In office 1999–2008
- Preceded by: Andrzej Beck
- Succeeded by: Magdalena Kapuścińska

Personal details
- Born: 28 April 1924 Wilno, Poland
- Died: 8 May 2018 (aged 94) Cornwall, New York, U.S.

Jacek Michal Gałązka (28 April 1924 – 8 May 2018) was a soldier of the Polish Armed Forces in the West, publicist and émigré activist. He served as President of the Józef Piłsudski Institute of America from 1999 until 2008.

== Biography ==
Gałązka was born in April 1924 in Wilno, Poland (now Vilnius, Lithuania). He served in the Cadets Corps in Rawicz, and from 1942 was a soldier of the Second Motorized Regiment in the First Armored Division of the Polish Armed Forces in the West.

He studied economics at the University of Edinburgh in Scotland and moved to the United States in 1952. There he founded Polish Heritage Publications and became a publisher of Polish literature in the English language.

Gałązka worked for Charles Scribner's Sons, eventually advancing to become its President. He also translated the works of Stanisław Jerzy Lec, including Unkempt Thoughts, and co-authored the Polish Heritage Travel Guide to USA & Canada. He served as President of the Józef Piłsudski Institute of America from 1999 to 2008.

He died in Cornwall, New York in May 2018 at the age of 94.

== Bibliography ==
- Biogram Jacka Gałązki na stronie Instytutu Józefa Piłsudskiego w Ameryce (in Polish)
