= Wacław Jędrzejewicz =

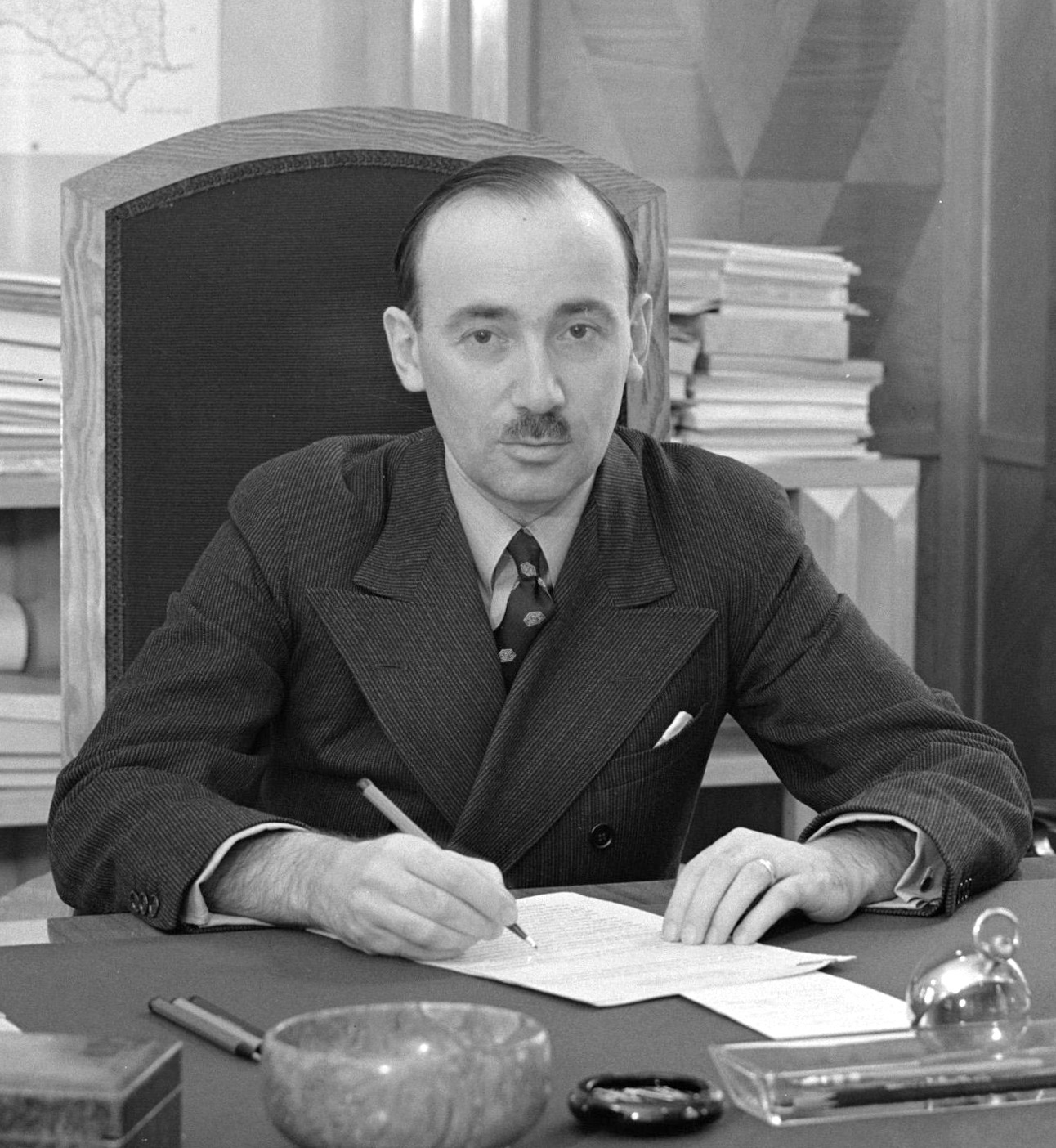
- Wacław Jędrzejewicz in 1934

President of the Piłsudski Institute of America
- In office 1977–1978
- Preceded by: Jan Fryling
- Succeeded by: Tadeusz Pawłowicz

Executive Director of the Piłsudski Institute of America
- In office 1943–1948
- Succeeded by: Marian Chodacki

Executive Director of the Piłsudski Institute of America
- In office 1963–1964
- Preceded by: Wincenty Kowalski
- Succeeded by: Jan Fryling

Personal details
- Born: 29 January 1893 Spiczyńce, Russian Empire (formerly Poland)
- Died: 30 November 1993 (aged 100) Cheshire, Connecticut, U.S.
- Resting place: Powązki Cemetery, Warsaw, Poland

General Wacław Jędrzejewicz (Polish pronunciation: [ˈvat͡swaf jɛndʐɛˈjɛvit͡ʂ]; 29 January 1893 – 30 November 1993) was a Polish Army officer, diplomat, politician and historian, and subsequently an American college professor.

He was co-founder, president, and long-time executive director of the Józef Piłsudski Institute of America.

== Life ==
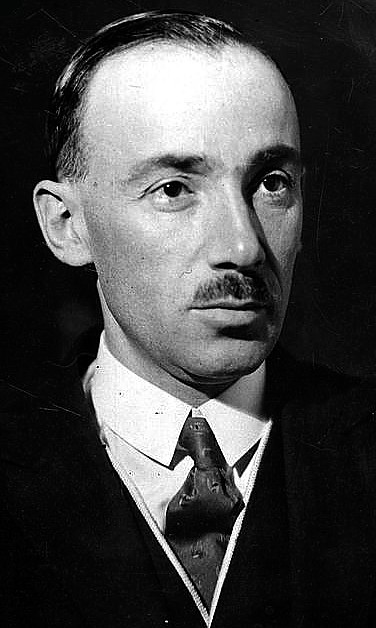
Jędrzejewicz, 1937

Jędrzejewicz was born in Spiczyńce, Russian Empire (prior to 1795 in Poland) to Polish parents. As a student at the Jagiellonian University in Kraków (1913–14), Jędrzejewicz joined Józef Piłsudski's Riflemen's Association (Związek Strzelecki). In 1915 he was one of the founders and leaders of the Polish Military Organisation (Polska Organizacja Wojskowa, or P.O.W.). In August 1915 he brought his "Warsaw Battalion" into the Polish Legions' First Brigade, then fighting in Volhynia. In July 1917, during the Legions' "Oath Crisis" (precipitated by a demand from Germany and Austro-Hungary that the Polish Legionnaires swear loyalty to them), Jędrzejewicz was imprisoned by the Germans.

When Poland regained independence in November 1918, Jędrzejewicz began work at the Polish Army's Section II (Oddział II, or Intelligence).

On 24 April 1920, Jędrzejewicz, now a captain, signed a military convention with Ukraine's Ataman Semen Petlura which paved the way for the Polish Army's 1920 Kiev Expedition. Next he served as Section II chief successively to Generals Kazimierz Sosnkowski and Gustaw Zygadłowicz. In September–November 1920, as a major, he was the Polish Army's liaison officer to allied Belarusian forces.

At the conclusion of the Polish–Soviet War of 1919–21, Jędrzejewicz was a military expert with the Polish delegation at the Riga Peace Conference.

In 1922–25 Jędrzejewicz directed the Polish General Staff's "East" Department. In 1925 he was promoted to lieutenant-colonel.

In 1925–28, he was military attaché and effective chargé d'affaires in Tokyo, Japan.

Returning to Poland, he served as director of the Foreign Ministry's Consular Department (1928-1933) and as Treasury Vice Minister (1933-1934). On 22 January 1934, he was appointed Minister of Religious Denominations and Public Education in the government of his brother, Premier Janusz Jędrzejewicz (1885-1951), serving on as well in the premierships of Leon Kozłowski and Walery Sławek. He introduced educational reforms that sparked controversy in Poland but won international approval and emulation.

After Marshal Józef Piłsudski died (1935), Jędrzejewicz held no more ministerial offices.

When World War II broke out in September 1939, Jędrzejewicz helped evacuate the treasury of the Fund for National Defense, which in February 1940 was delivered to General Władysław Sikorski's Polish government-in-exile in Paris. Due to the anti-Piłsudskiite policies of General Sikorski (whose prewar career had been derailed by differences with Piłsudski), Jędrzejewicz was prevented from serving now with the Polish Armed Forces in exile. Consequently, in March 1941 he emigrated to New York City.

On 4 July 1943, Jędrzejewicz co-founded the Józef Piłsudski Institute of America, dedicated to studying recent Polish history, and was its first director (5 July 1943 — 28 September 1948).

In 1948 Jędrzejewicz became professor of Russian language and literature at Wellesley College. In 1958-1963 he was director of Slavic studies at Ripon College in Wisconsin.

On retiring, he returned to New York, where in 1964 he again became director of the Józef Piłsudski Institute.

Jędrzejewicz died at the age of 100 on 30 November 1993, in Cheshire, Connecticut, the last of Marshal Piłsudski's government ministers and the last co-founder of the Józef Piłsudski Institute of America. He was interred on 4 June 1994 at Powązki Cemetery in Warsaw, Poland.

== Works ==
Jędrzejewicz published some 300 scholarly papers in history and several major books, including Poland in the British Parliament, 1939-45 and a two-volume Kronika życia Józefa Piłsudskiego (Chronicle of the Life of Józef Piłsudski). His English-language publications also included Piłsudski: a Life for Poland, New York, Hippocrene Books, 1982.

== Recognition ==
Jędrzejewicz was awarded the Silver Cross of Virtuti Militari (personally by Marshal Józef Piłsudski, 11 November 1921), the Cross of Independence with Swords, the Cross of Valour (Krzyż Walecznych) four times and the Order of Polonia Restituta, Classes I (Grand Cross, 1993) and IV, and received decorations of 13 countries, including the French Legion of Honour. In 1993, Jędrzejewicz was awarded Honorary Citizenship of the Royal City of Kraków.

In 1992 Jędrzejewicz was promoted by Polish President Lech Wałęsa to the rank of brigadier general.

== See also ==
- Prometheism
- List of Poles
