= Juliusz Łukasiewicz =

Polish diplomat

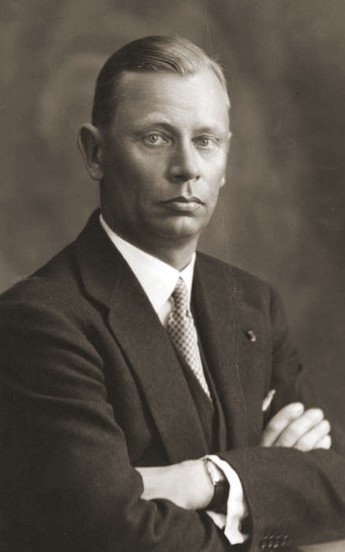

Poland Ambassador to the Soviet Union
- In office April 12, 1934 – June 20, 1936
- Preceded by: Stanisław Patek
- Succeeded by: Wacław Grzybowski

Poland Ambassador to France
- In office July 20, 1936 – November 7, 1939
- Preceded by: Alfred Chłapowski
- Succeeded by: Kajetan Dzierżykraj-Morawski

Personal details
- Born: May 6, 1892 Sokolivka, Olgopolsky Uyezd, Podolia Governorate, Russian Empire
- Died: April 6, 1951 (aged 58) Washington, D.C., USA
- Children: Juliusz Łukasiewicz (engineer)
- Profession: Politician, Ambassador

Juliusz Łukasiewicz (Polish pronunciation: [ˈjuljuʂ wukaˈɕɛvitʂ]; May 6, 1892 – April 6, 1951) was a Polish diplomat, an ambassador of Poland to the Soviet Union and France, and a Polish Freemason.

== Biography ==
Łukasiewicz was born on May 6, 1892, in Sokolivka, in the Podolia Governorate of the Russian Empire (now in Ukraine). He was a Piłsudskiite and a supporter of Józef Piłsudski's Prometheism project. In 1914, Łukasiewicz joined the Polish Combat Organization. Upon the creation of the Liquidation Committee for Affairs in the Kingdom of Poland in March 1917, he served as the personal secretary to the committee led by Aleksander Lednicki. Łukasiewicz soon served as first secretary representing the Regency Council in Moscow.

Łukasiewicz joined the Polish Ministry of Foreign Affairs on January 1, 1919. As a specialist in Polish-Soviet relations, he joined the Eastern Department of the aforementioned ministry in 1921. He served as Polish envoy to France in Paris for a year. After his return from France in 1922, he assumed the leadership of the Eastern Department and served there for four years until 1926. From 1926 to 1934, he served as Polish envoy in several European countries in Riga, Latvia, from 1926 to 1929; in Vienna, Austria, from 1931 to 1932; and in Moscow, Soviet Union from 1933 to 1934. In 1934, he was appointed Polish ambassador to the Soviet Union and remained in Moscow until June 1936. From July 1936, he served as the Polish ambassador to France until November 7, 1939.

Upon the Invasion of Poland in September 1939, Łukasiewicz energetically lobbied the French government and military officials to fulfill their obligations towards the Franco-Polish Alliance and the Kasprzycki-Gamelin Convention.

During the formation of the Polish Government in Exile in France, Łukasiewicz was forced by the French to resign from his position as Polish Ambassador to France. Upon the evacuation of the Polish government-in-exile from France to the United Kingdom, conflicts between Prime Minister Władysław Sikorski and Łukasiewicz prevented the latter from any political activity in the government-in-exile in London.

Łukasiewicz strongly opposed Sikorski's government in London. After the defeat of France in 1940, Łukasiewicz wrote a manifest to President Władysław Raczkiewicz criticising Sikorski's decision to send a manifest to Stefan Litauer that proposed the creation of a 300,000-strong Polish Army under the command of the Soviet Union. Łukasiewicz additionally criticized Sikorski for squandering Polish forces in France to the enemy during the hasty retreat in May 1940, the loss of Polish bullion and for simultaneously assuming the seat of Prime Minister and General Inspector of the Armed Forces. Łukasiewicz's manifest greatly influenced Raczkiewicz's decision to dismiss Sikorski's premiership on July 19, 1940. However, under strong protest from Sikorski's sympathizers, which included the British government itself, Raczkiewicz was forced to reinstate Sikorski six days later on July 25.

After the war, Łukasiewicz remained abroad. From 1947 to 1950, he served as vice-chairman at the Institute of International Research in London. He was an activist among Piłdsuskiites in exile and a member of the Liga Niepodległości Polski. In September 1950, he emigrated to the United States. In April 1951, Łukasiewicz committed suicide.

== Honours ==
Łukasiewicz received the Estonian Cross of Liberty, 2nd Class.

== See also ==
- Prometheism
- List of Poles
