= Józef Beck =

Polish politician (1894–1944)

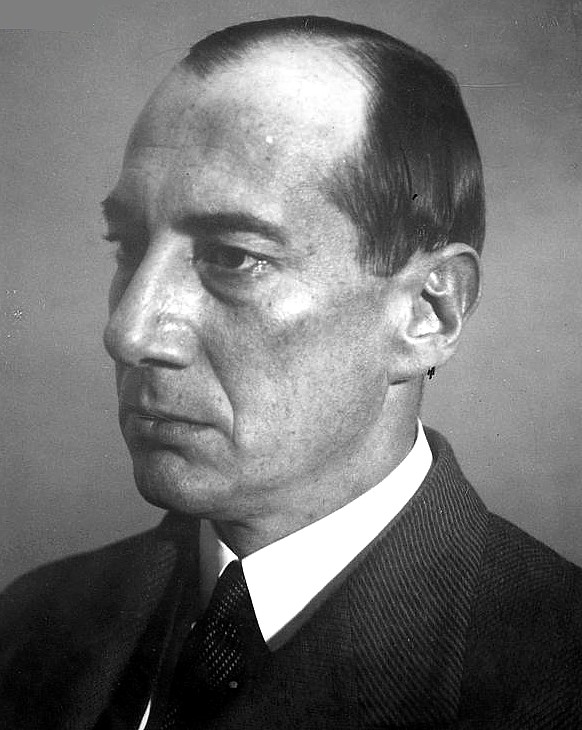
- Beck before 1939

Minister of Foreign Affairs
- In office 2 November 1932 – 30 September 1939
- President: Ignacy Mościcki
- Prime Minister: Aleksander Prystor; Janusz Jędrzejewicz; Leon Kozłowski; Walery Sławek; Marian Kościałkowski; Felicjan Sławoj Składkowski
- Preceded by: August Zaleski
- Succeeded by: August Zaleski

Personal details
- Born: 4 October 1894 Warsaw, Congress Poland, Russian Empire
- Died: 5 June 1944 (aged 49) Stănești, Romania

Military service
- Allegiance: Austria-Hungary (1914–1917); (Second Polish Republic) Poland (1918–1930)
- Branch/service: Polish Legions; Polish Army
- Years of service: 1914–1917 (Polish Legions); 1918–1930 (Poland)
- Rank: Second lieutenant (Polish Legions); Certified Colonel (Poland)
- Battles/wars: World War I; Polish–Ukrainian War; Polish–Soviet War

Józef Beck (Polish: [ˈjuzɛv ˈbɛk]; 4 October 1894 – 5 June 1944) was a Polish statesman who served the Second Republic of Poland as foreign minister, diplomat, and military officer. A close associate of Józef Piłsudski, Beck is most famous for his role as Polish foreign minister, largely setting Polish foreign policy, in the 1930s.

He tried to fulfill Piłsudski's dream of making Poland the leader of a regional bloc, but he was widely disliked and distrusted by other governments. He was involved in territorial disputes with Lithuania and Czechoslovakia.

With his nation caught between two large hostile powers, Germany and the Soviet Union, Beck sometimes pursued accommodation with them and sometimes defied them, attempting to take advantage of their mutual antagonism.

He formed an alliance with the United Kingdom and France, and both declared war on Germany after its invasion of Poland in 1939. After the Soviet Union also invaded Poland, Beck and the rest of the Polish government evacuated to Romania.

== Early life ==
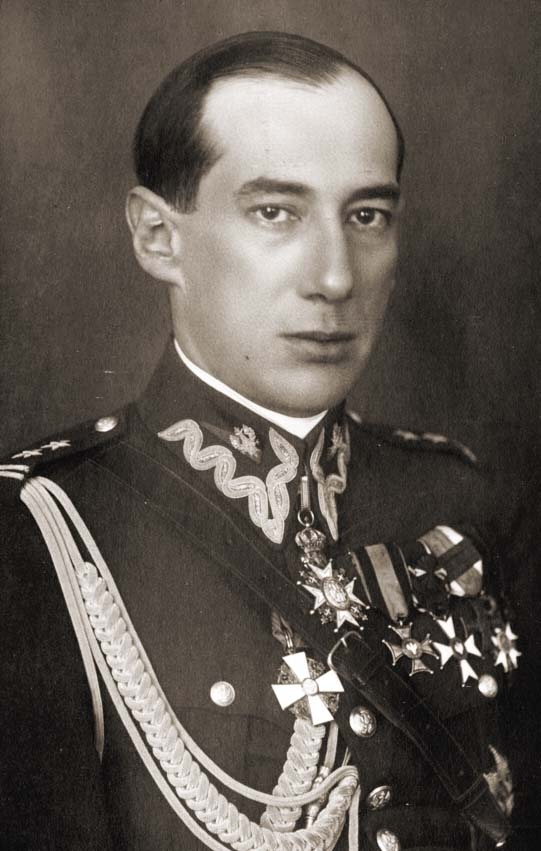
Józef Beck, 1926

Beck was born into a Calvinist (Protestant) family whose forebears had emigrated from Flanders to Poland in the 16th century, during the rule of Polish King Stephen Báthory. When World War I started, Beck was a student at a college of engineering. After the outbreak of the war, Beck was a member of the clandestine Polish Military Organization (Polska Organizacja Wojskowa, or POW), founded in October 1914 by Piłsudski. Joining in 1914, Beck served until 1917 in the First Brigade of the Polish Legions and was an aide to Piłsudski. When the brigade was interned, Beck escaped.

After Poland had regained its independence Beck held command of an artillery battery. He was assigned to the General Staff, and served as military attaché to France between 1922 and 1923. The French disliked Beck to the point of spreading lies about him, such as that he was a Soviet agent. He helped to carry out the May 1926 military coup d'état, which brought Piłsudski to de facto governmental power.

In 1926–1930, Beck served as chief of staff to Poland's Minister of Military Affairs, and in 1930–1932 was Vice Prime Minister and Vice Minister of Foreign Affairs. Groomed by Piłsudski to implement Poland's foreign policy, in 1932 he took office as Minister of Foreign Affairs, a post that he held until the outbreak of World War II.

== Foreign minister ==
Beck had been dealt a weak hand. The historian David G. Williamson argues that Poland with 35 million people had a large population but a thin industrial base. Furthermore, its army of 283,000 men was ill-equipped, short of artillery, poorly trained and heavily reliant on cavalry because it lacked enough mechanisation. Finally it faced long borders with two powerful dictatorships, Hitler's Germany and Stalin's Soviet Union. Historian Richard Overy wrote that of all the new states in Europe:

Poland was almost certainly the most disliked and her Foreign Minister the most distrusted. Poland's pursuit of an independent line left her bereft of any close friends by the end of 1938.... The Western powers saw Poland as a greedy revisionist power, illiberal, anti-Semitic, pro-German; Beck was a 'menace', arrogant and treacherous.

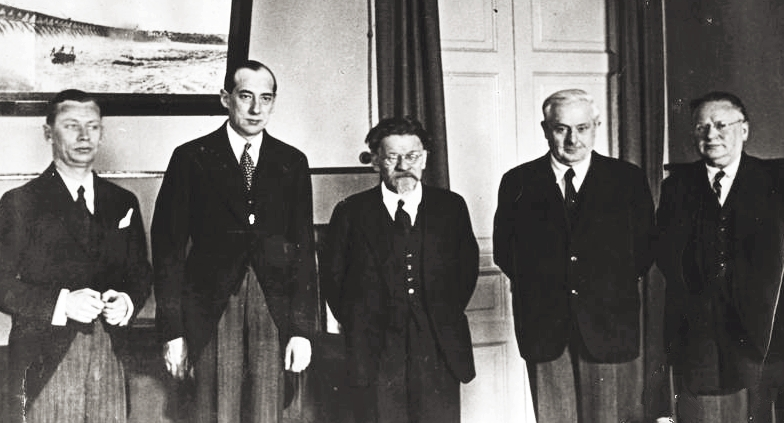
Visit to Soviet Union, 1934. From right: Maxim Litvinov, Avel Yenukidze, Mikhail Kalinin, Józef Beck, Juliusz Łukasiewicz.

In his international diplomacy, Beck sought to maintain a fine balance in Poland's relations with its two powerful neighbours. In July 1932, he concluded the Soviet–Polish Non-Aggression Pact and, in January 1934, the German–Polish declaration of non-aggression.

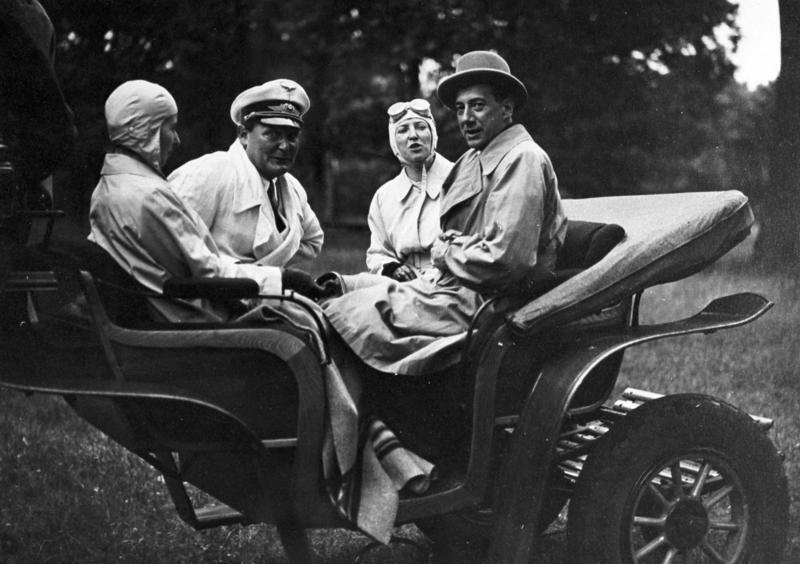
With Hermann Göring, 1935

Beck complained that while Poland and Czechoslovakia were legally bound by treaty to respect the rights of their respective German minorities, the Polish minorities in Germany and the Soviet Union were not so protected. In addition, Beck resented that countries such as Germany used the Minorities Treaty to exert pressure and become involved in the internal affairs of Poland. In September 1934, Beck renounced the Minorities Treaty after the Soviet Union had been admitted to the League of Nations.

After Piłsudski's death in May 1935, a power-sharing agreement was entered into by the various Piłsudskiite factions, led by General (later Marshal) Edward Rydz-Śmigły, President Ignacy Mościcki and Beck himself. These three individuals effectively dominated the Sanation government and collectively ruled Poland until the outbreak of the Second World War. The stability of the ruling group was weakened because of personal conflicts; none of the three men managed to assert full dominance in the late 1930s, and Beck had a more-or-less free hand in formulating Poland's foreign policy. The oligarchy from 1935 to 1939 is often described by historians as a "dictatorship without a dictator".

== Strategic ideas ==
Hitler and Beck, 1937

Beck was hostile to the League of Nations and did not think it could help Poland. France wanted some arrangement with Poland but distrusted Beck and so he looked in new directions. He explored the possibility of realising Piłsudski's concept of Międzymorze ("Between-seas"), a federation of central and eastern European countries stretching from the Baltic Sea to the Black Sea, or, in later further variants, from the Arctic Ocean to the Mediterranean. Such a unit, lying between Germany in the west and the Soviet Union in the east, might have been strong enough to deter both from military intervention. Beck realised there was no realistic chance of achieving this in the immediate future, and so was prepared to settle in 1937–1938 for a diplomatic bloc referred to as a "Third Europe", led by Poland, which might eventually become the nucleus of a Międzymorze federation. Beck's "Third Europe" diplomatic concept comprised Poland, Italy, Yugoslavia, Hungary and Romania.

His efforts failed for several reasons:

- None of the other four states that was meant to form the "Third Europe" with Poland was interested in accepting Polish leadership.
- Both Italy and Hungary preferred to align themselves with Germany, rather than Poland.
- The desire of both Italy and Hungary to partition Yugoslavia blocked any effort to include Rome, Budapest and Belgrade in an alliance.
- The dispute between Romania and Hungary over Transylvania doomed efforts to include them in a common bloc.

From 1935 to 1939, Beck supported German claims against Czechoslovakia by citing alleged mistreatment of Polish minorities in Czechoslovakia. In January 1938, he demanded publicly that the Poles living in Czechoslovakia be granted the rights enjoyed by the Germans. He had also begun a diplomatic offensive in favour of Slovak independence in 1937. He supported Hitler's position in the Munich Agreement in 1938. Within days of the agreement, Poland invaded and seized Teschen, an industrial district of Czechoslovakia with 240,000 people, where ethnic Poles formed only 35%.

== 1939: German invasion ==
In 1937, Hitler continued to assure Beck that Germany had no claims on Danzig, but changed this position at the start of 1939, now laying claim to Danzig, although adding that military force would not be used.

Beck played a decisive role in early 1939 by staunchly refusing Hitler's demands to subordinate Poland and to turn it into a German puppet state. Hitler demanded for Poland to give away strategic territories to Germany and to join the Anti-Comintern Pact, which was directed against the Soviet Union. Beck rejected Hitler's demands for annexation of the Polish Corridor, which would have cut off Polish access to the sea and its main trade route, effectively making the Polish economy dependent on Germany. He also rejected demands for an extraterritorial rail and highway corridor that was to run to East Prussia and the Free City of Danzig, in exchange for vague promises regarding trade and annexation of territories inhabited by Ukrainians and Belarusians in the Soviet Union after a future war. While Hitler had been planning to annex Polish territory for several years, he finally decided to go ahead with his plans for war by early September 1939.

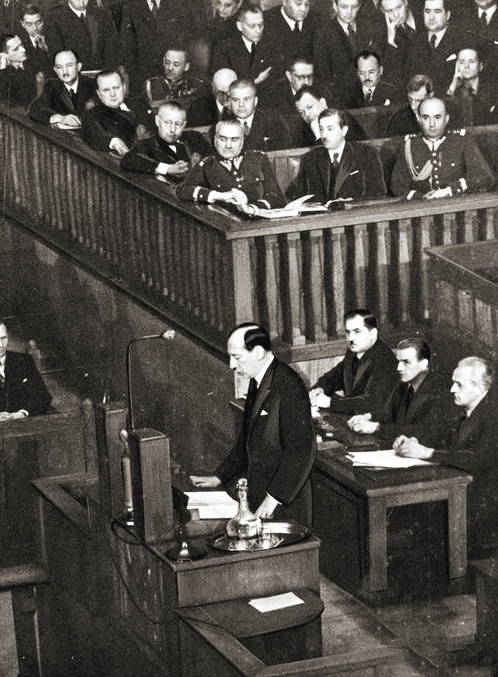
5 May 1939—Beck addresses the Sejm, rejecting Hitler's demands.

Beck was surprised when Britain, looking for a pretext to confront Germany, announced at the end of March 1939 that it would defend Poland from German attack. France also offered its support, but both countries knew there was very little they could do if Germany invaded Poland.

In April 1939, Beck was in London to negotiate the terms of the Anglo-Polish alliance. Beck famously voiced his refusal of German demands in a speech on 5 May 1939:

Peace is a precious and a desirable thing. Our generation, bloodied in wars, certainly deserves peace. But peace, like almost all things of this world, has its price, a high but a measurable one. We in Poland do not know the concept of peace at any price. There is only one thing in the lives of men, nations and countries that is without price. That thing is honor.

Similarly, Beck refused a request from the Soviets to allow Soviet forces to enter the country, arguing that once the Red Army was on Polish soil it would not leave. A third proposal soon followed, once again elaborated by Britain, which promised support to the Polish government if the country's borders were endangered. This, Beck accepted. According to Joseph E. Davies, the Polish government underestimated German military power.

As a result, Hitler's diplomatic efforts shifted to the Soviet Union and secured the German-Soviet alliance in August 1939. Known as the Molotov–Ribbentrop Pact, it secured Soviet support in a war, a heavy flow of Soviet food and oil, and an agreement to partition Poland and the Baltic states. By now, many observers realised that war between Germany and Poland had become imminent.

== World War II ==
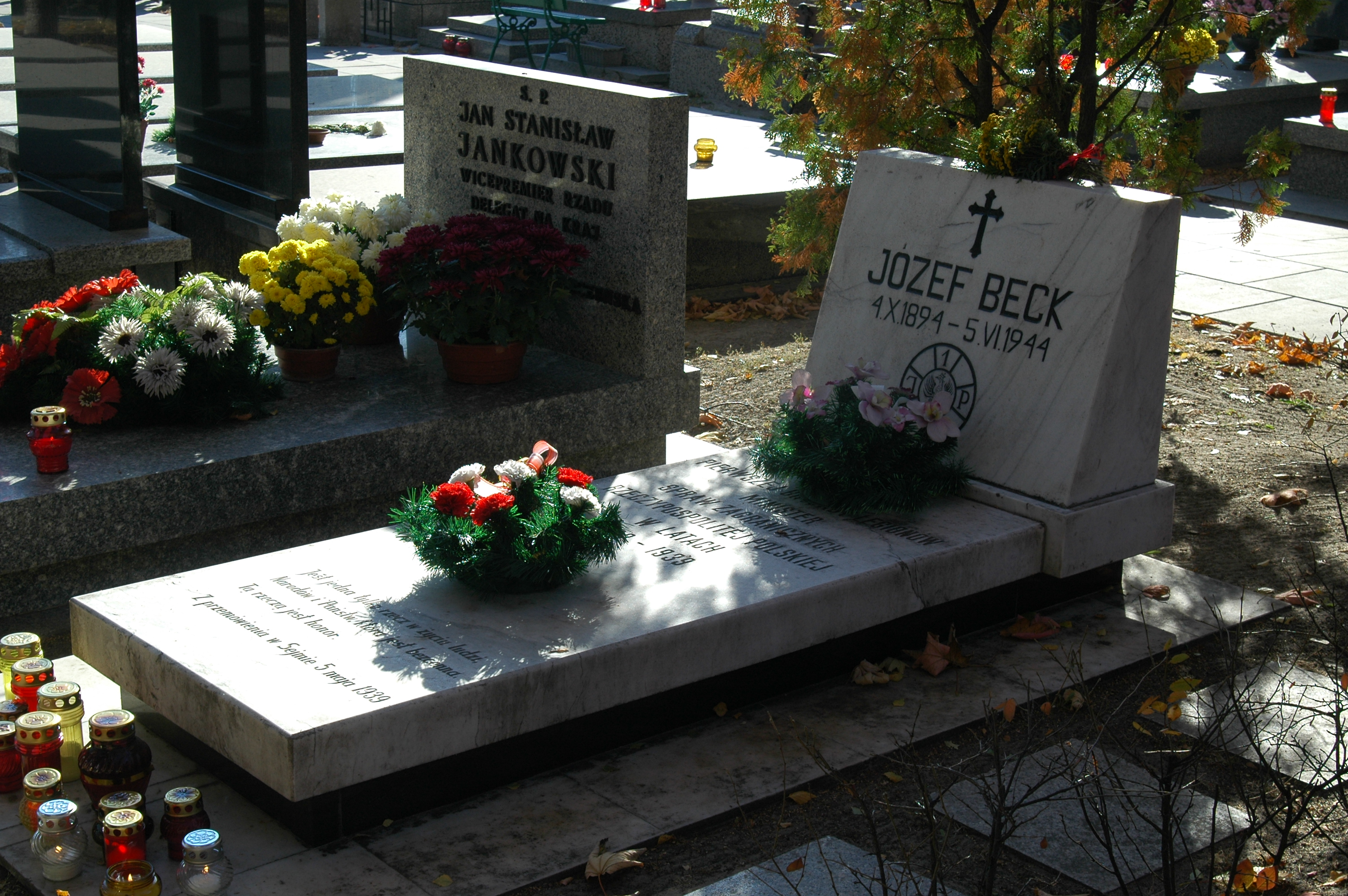
Graves of Józef Beck and Jan Jankowski, Powązki Military Cemetery, Warsaw

Following the invasion of Poland by Germany on 1 September 1939, the start of World War II, Beck called on Poland's allies, France and Britain, to enter the war to support Poland. In spite of the agreement between them, France and Britain did little to help Poland directly, though both declared war two days after the German invasion.

After the Soviet Union attacked Poland from the east on 17 September 1939, Beck withdrew to Romania, together with the rest of the Polish government. In Romania, he was interned by the authorities at a hotel in Brașov. It was there that he wrote a volume of memoirs, Ostatni raport (Final Report).

Melchior Wańkowicz, a popular Polish journalist, met Beck in the autumn of 1939 during his internment in Romania. This is how he described the meeting:

Beck was locked in a golden cage of a luxurious hotel in Brașov, where he and his entourage occupied one floor. He was closely guarded: whenever he went out, hordes of Allied, German and Romanian agents followed him (...) I met him at 5 in the afternoon, and our conversation continued until almost two in the morning, with a dinner break. Beck emphasized achievements of the last month of his post: a military treaty with England, Hungarian refusal to let German troops pass through their territory, droit de residence and droit de passage, granted by Romanian government. Beck believes in a solid coalition, and that we would sit at a negotiating table as partners, while Czechs would remain outside. He does not care about the fact that Lloyd George stated that Poland did not deserve help as a reactionary country. He is not bothered by the fact that Lord Halifax wants to recreate the Curzon Line. Instead, he points out that when British king gave a speech on the radio, only English, French and Polish anthems were played (...) Since I cannot tolerate this kind of wishful thinking, I ask him whether he had ever seriously considered German attack. He keeps saying that he had met Hitler several times, that Hitler backs out of discussions, that he can easily be talked into different things, that he was influenced by von Ribbentrop.

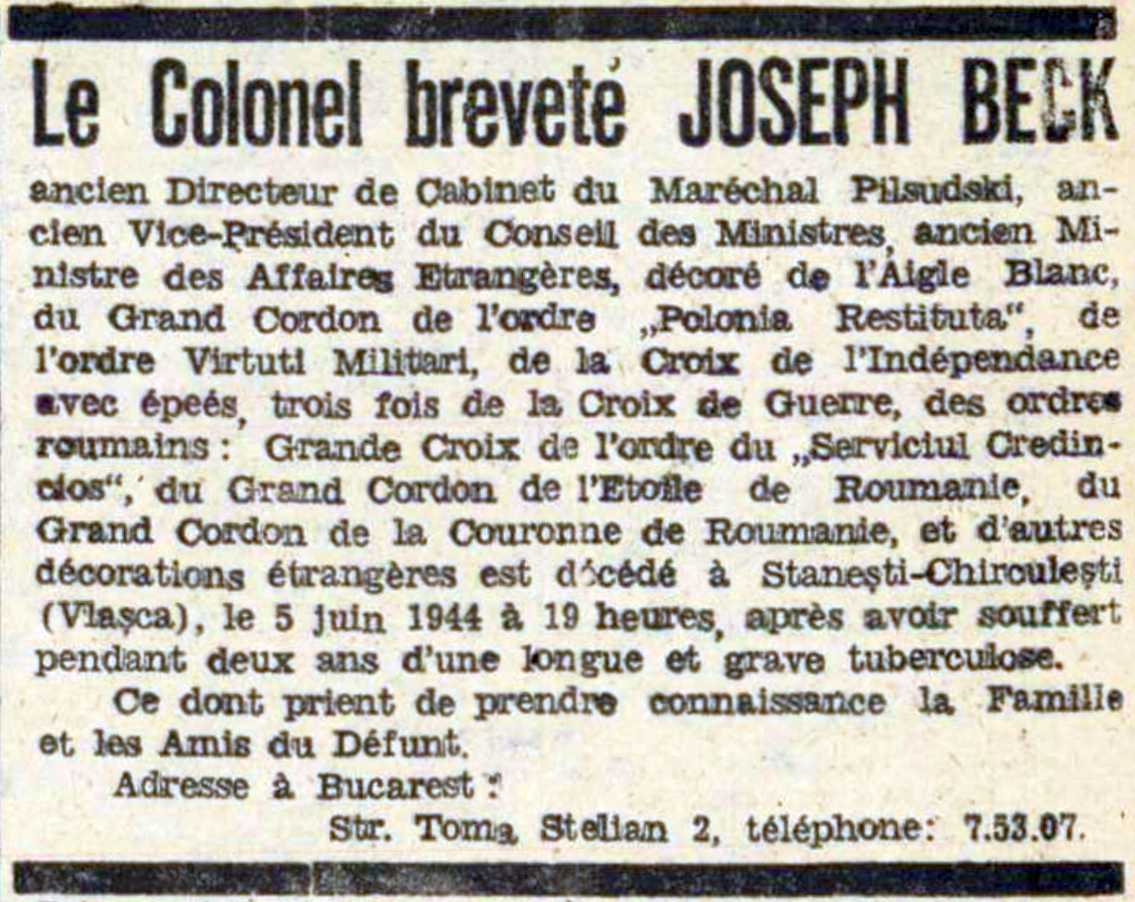
Beck's death announcement

Beck died in Singureni, Romania, on 5 June 1944, after developing tuberculosis. He was survived by his son Andrzej Beck, who was active in the Polish community in the United States until his death in 2011.

In May 1991, Beck's remains were repatriated to Poland and interred at Warsaw's Powązki Military Cemetery.

== Honors ==
- Legion of Honour (France) in the grade of Chevalier (1923) and in the grade of Officier (1927)
- Order of Saint Sava (Yugoslavia) I degree

== Sources ==
- Biskupski, M.B. (2000). The history of Poland. Westport, CT: Greenwood Press. ISBN 978-0-313-30571-9.
- Cienciala, Anna M. (2011). "The Foreign Policy of Józef Piłsudski and Józef Beck, 1926-1939: Misconceptions and Interpretations" (PDF). The Polish Review. LVI (1–2).
- Cienciala, Anna. "The Munich Crisis of 1938: Plans and Strategy in Warsaw in the Context of Western Appeasement of Germany" in The Munich crisis, 1938: Prelude to World War II, edited by Igor Lukes and Erik Goldstein, London, Frank Cass, Inc., 1999. pp. 48–81
- Cienciala, Anna M. Poland the Western Powers, 1938-1939. A Study in the Interdependence of Eastern and Western Europe (U. Toronto Press, 1968) online
- Greenwood, Sean. "The Phantom Crisis: Danzig, 1939," in The Origins of the Second World War Reconsidered: A.J.P. Taylor and the Historians, edited by Gordon Martel, London, Routledge, 1999. pp. 247–72
- Gromada, Thaddeus V. "Joseph Beck in the Light of Recent Polish Historiography," Polish Review (1981) 26#3 pp 65–73
- Overy, Richard J. (1999). The road to war. with Andrew Wheatcroft (second ed.). Penguin Books. ISBN 9780140285307.
- Roberts, Henry (1953). "The Diplomacy of Colonel Beck". In Craig, Gordon A.; Gilbert, Felix (eds.). The Diplomats, 1919-1939. Vol. 2, The Thirties. Princeton University Press.
- Steiner, Zara (2011). The Triumph of the Dark: European International History, 1933-1939. Oxford University Press. ISBN 9780199212002.
- Tighe, Carl (1990). Gdańsk National Identity in the Polish-German Borderlands. Pluto. ISBN 0-7453-0474-5.
- Watt, Richard (1998). Bitter Glory Poland and its Fate (third ed.). Hippocrene Books. ISBN 0781806739.
