= Enigma Cipher Centre =

- Centrum Szyfrów Enigma
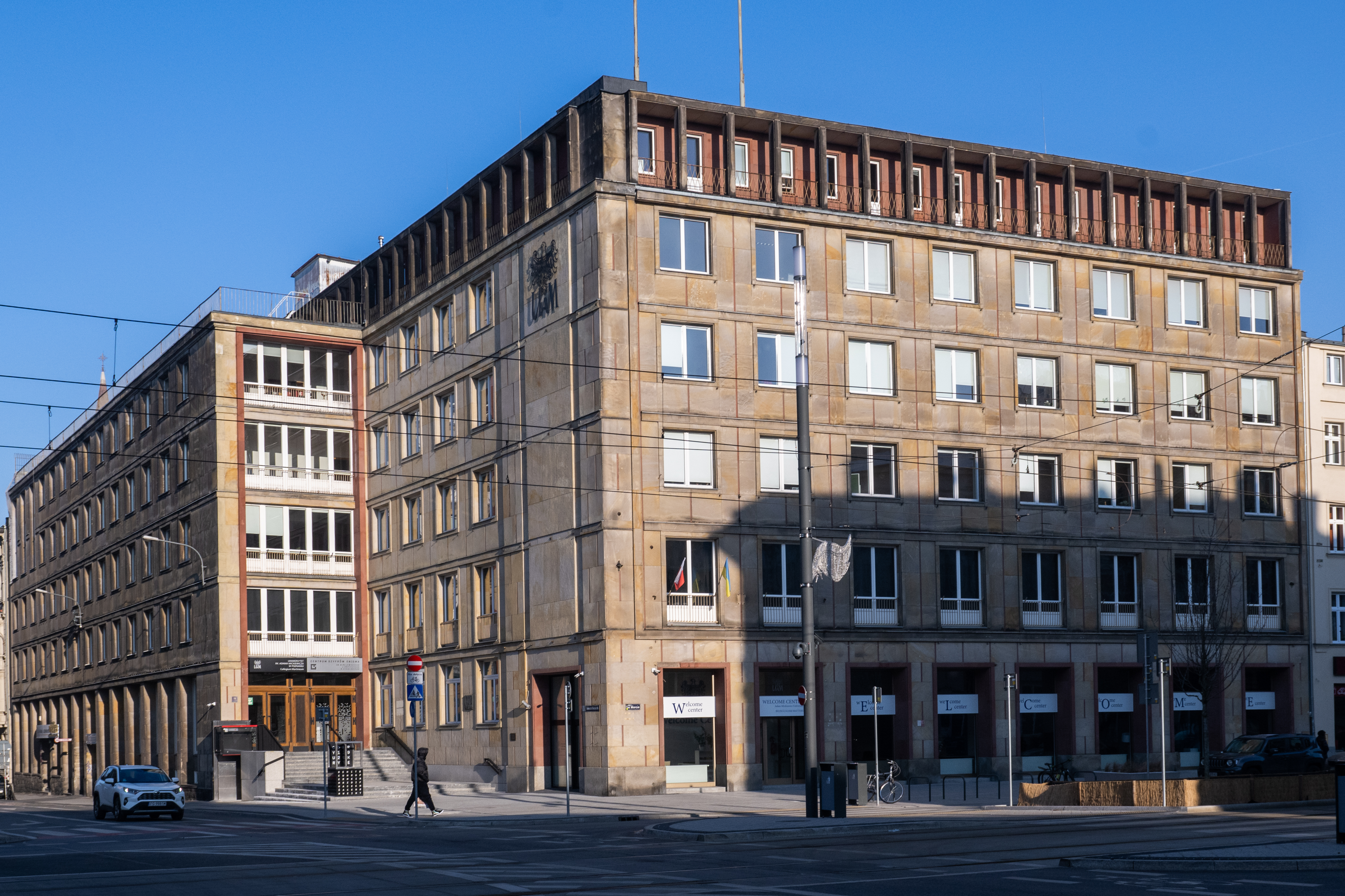
- Established: 25 September 2021; 4 years ago
- Location: Święty Marcin 78, Poznań, Poland
- Coordinates: 52°24′27″N 16°55′11″E
- Director: Piotr Bojarski
- Website: csenigma.pl/en/

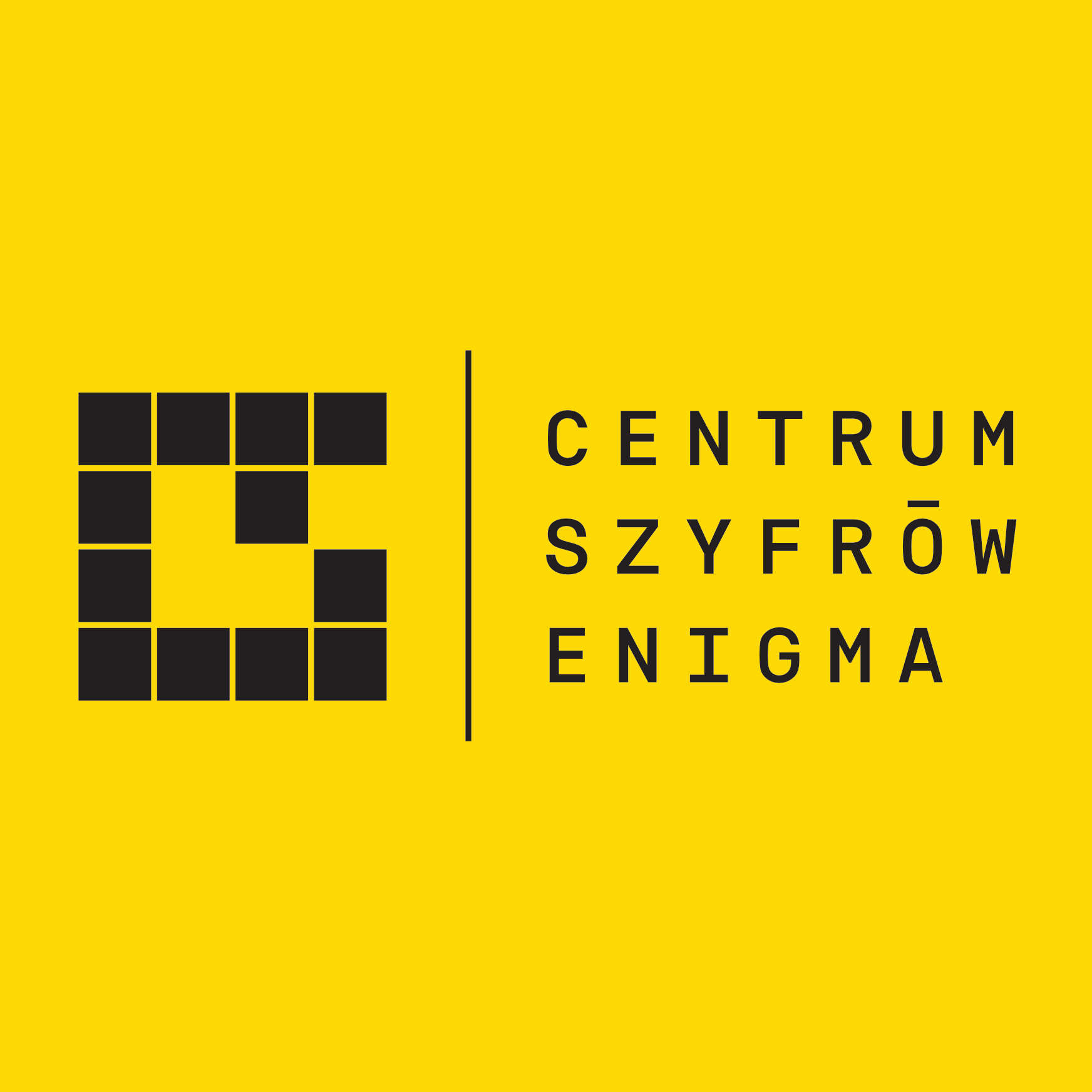
Logo of Enigma Cipher Centre

The Enigma Cipher Centre (Polish: Centrum Szyfrów Enigma) is an interactive multimedia exhibition in Poznan dedicated to the Enigma cipher machine and the three Polish cryptologists -- Marian Rejewski, Henryk Zygalski and Jerzy Rozycki—who played a key role in its early cryptanalysis. It is located in the former Collegium Historicum building. The Enigma Cipher Centre is a brand of the Poznan Heritage Center.

== Description ==
The center is a joint venture of the city of Poznań and Adam Mickiewicz University in Poznań. The idea to create such a place, originally referred to as the Enigma Museum, was introduced by radio journalist Szymon Mazur.

The construction of the center was implemented as part of the "Preservation, protection, promotion and development of natural and cultural heritage of the Wielkopolska Regional Operational Program between 2014 and 2020," in cooperation with the Adam Mickiewicz University. The facility was opened in September 2021. The general manager is Piotr Bojarski.

== History ==
The current location of the center was originally occupied by the building of the military headquarters of the 5th Army Corps of the German Empire (Königliche Intendantur des V Armeekorps) built between 1843 and 1847.

After World War I the headquarters of the Wielkopolska 14th Infantry Division was placed there. Part of the rooms were used by the Poznan branch of the Cipher Bureau of the general staff of the Polish army, where the three leading early cryptanalysts of the Enigma -- Marian Rejewski, Henryk Zygalski and Jerzy Różycki -- worked.

Following the outbreak of World War II the building was used by the German Army. The building was severely damaged, and in 1948, the decision was made not to rebuild it but to construct a new building to house the headquarters of the Polish United Workers' Party's authorities, which were located here until 1990. Subsequently, the building was handed over to the Adam Mickiewicz University to accommodate the Department of History, which existed there till 2015 until its relocation to the Morasko campus.

== Projects ==
In addition to the permanent exposition of the Enigma Cipher Centre, the institution is conducting a project called “Residences at CSE”. The aim of the project is to support various creative initiatives commemorating the participation of Polish cryptologists in breaking the code of the Enigma cipher machine.

As part of the project, Patryk Pilasiewicz (pl. Patryk Piłasiewicz), a contrabassist, conductor and composer runs an open, interdisciplinary workshop called CSE Open Lab. Artistic shows are being organized directly at the center's permanent exposition space. Students from the Ignacy Paderewski Music Academy as well as students from the IT and telecommunications department of the Poznan Polytechnic School participated in the first edition of the project.

On November 10, 2021, as part of the “Subtractive Synthesis. Sound Architecture” (pl. Synteza subtraktywna. Architektura dźwięku) project, the first workshops took place, followed by November 24 workshops called “Listening Sessions. Presentations of the elements of the SubRosa" (pl. «Odsłuchy. Prezentacje elementów projektu SubRosa») project. On December 1 and 8, 2021 rehearsals for the Subrosa scattered concert took place at the Media Library and permanent exposition space.

On December 16, 2021, the scattered “Sub Rosa” concert took place at the permanent exposition area, organized on the occasion of the 89th anniversary of breaking of the Enigma code by Polish cryptologists. Students of Ignacy Paderewski Music Academy as well as Adam Mickiewicz University chamber choir directed by professor Krzysztof Szydzisz participated in the concert. The viewers had the opportunity to take part in the concert by walking through the exposition and meeting the musicians who in various parts of the exposition were performing the pieces inspired by the history of the three Poznan mathematicians and the Enigma Cipher Centre.

The title of the concert “Sub Rosa” is taken from Latin : “under the rose” which refers to the rose as the ancient symbol of mystery.

=== The Cipher Girls ===
The Cipher Girls (pl. Szyfrodziewczyny) is an educational and cultural herstory project organized by the Enigma Cipher Center. The aim of the project is to popularize knowledge about outstanding women, pioneers in the fields of mathematics, philosophy, computer science, cryptology and intelligence services during World War II.

As part of the project, a STEAM workroom was created in the building where the Enigma Cipher Center is located - the acronym comes from the names of five disciplines: science, technology, engineering, art and mathematics. The workroom hosts a temporary exhibition "Cipher_girls", which introduces visitors to the history and achievements of twenty outstanding women associated with the exact sciences, the development of digital technologies and activities during World War II.

== Photo ==
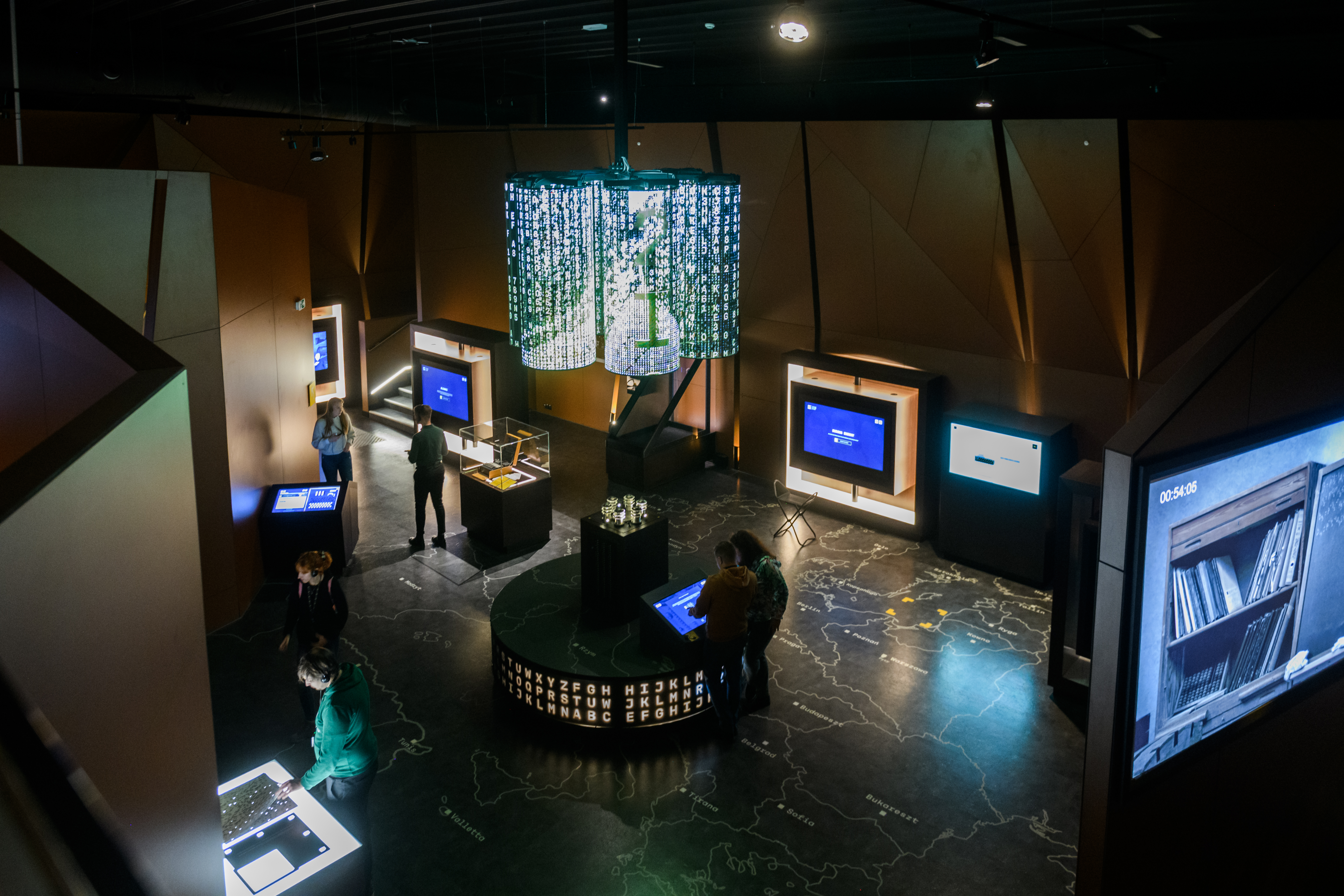
Fragment of the permanent exposition of the Enigma Cipher Centre

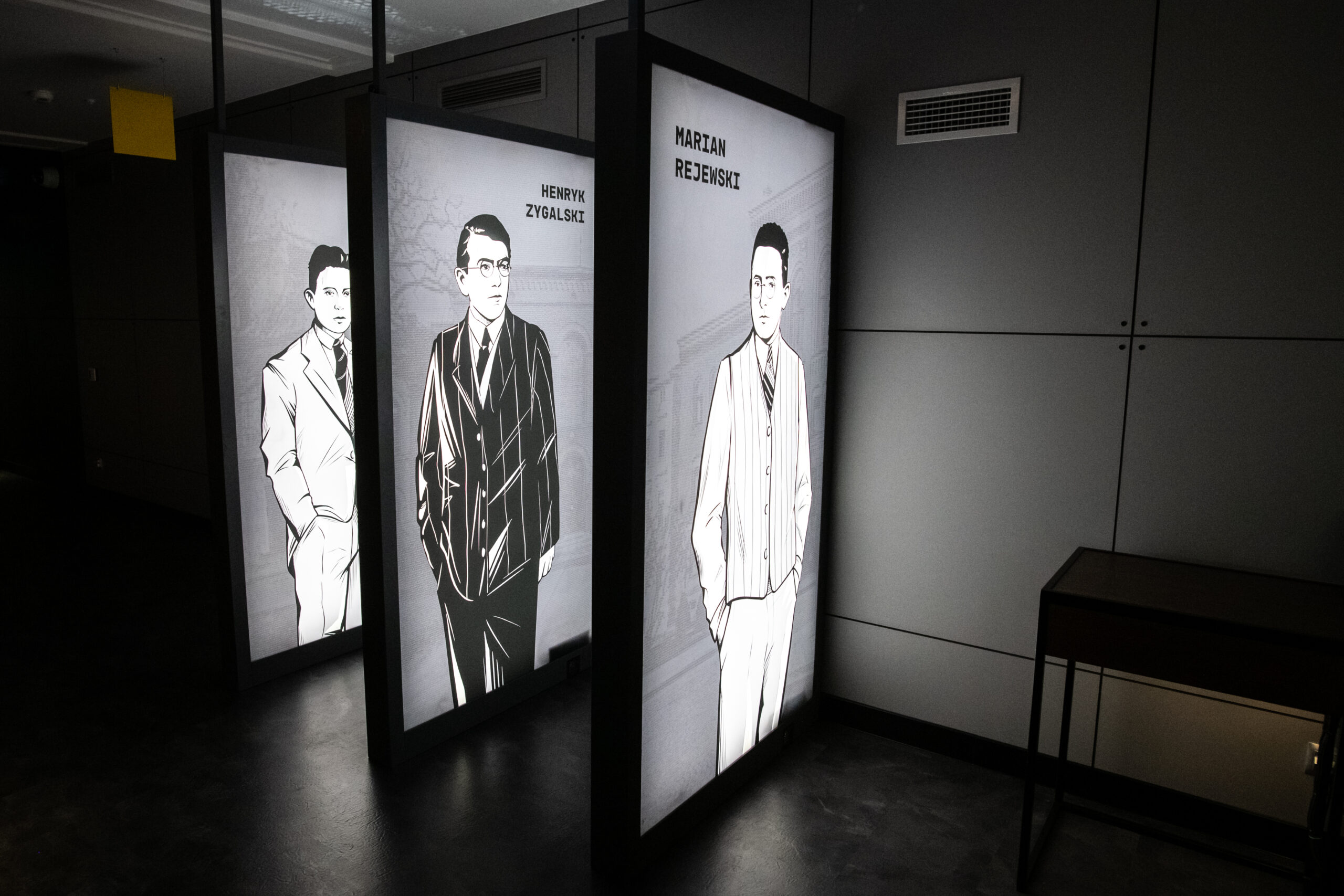
Fragment of the permanent exposition

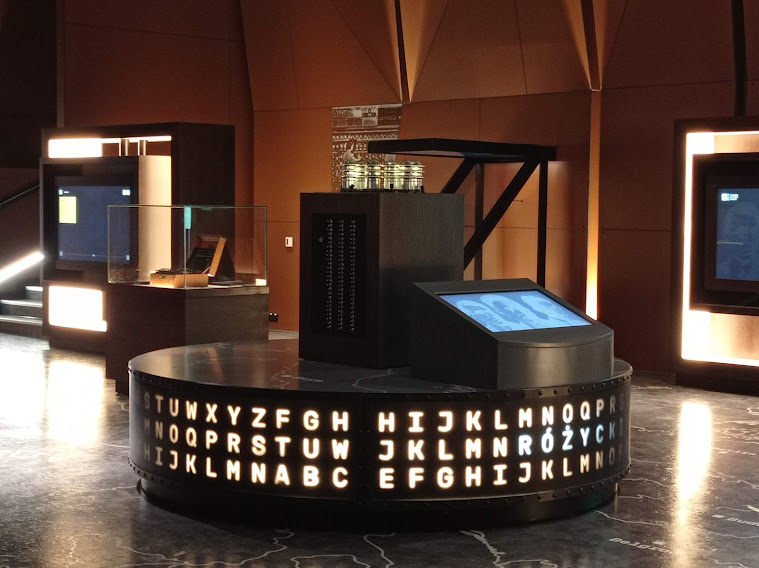
Fragment of the permanent exposition, replica of the Rejewski cryptologic bomb

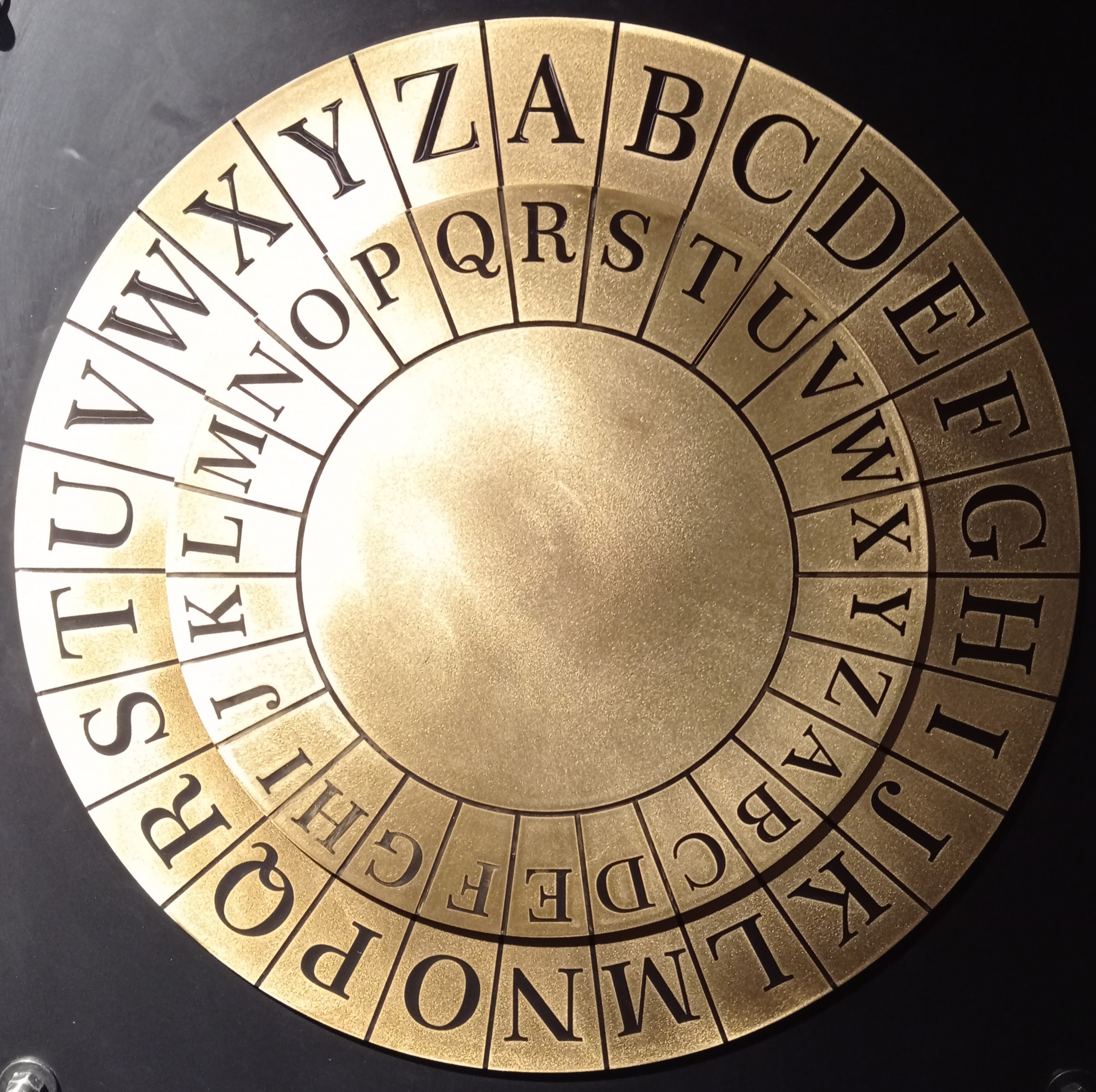
Alberti cipher

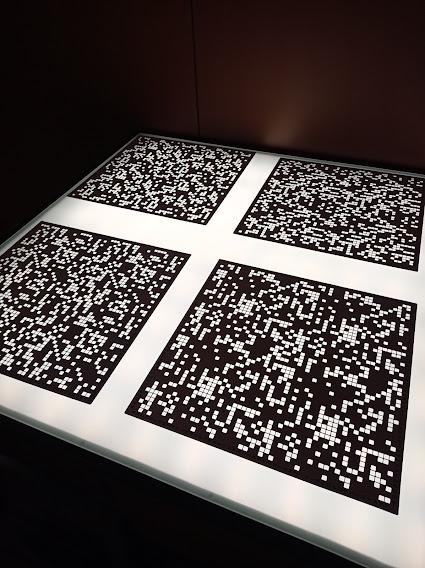
Zygalski sheets

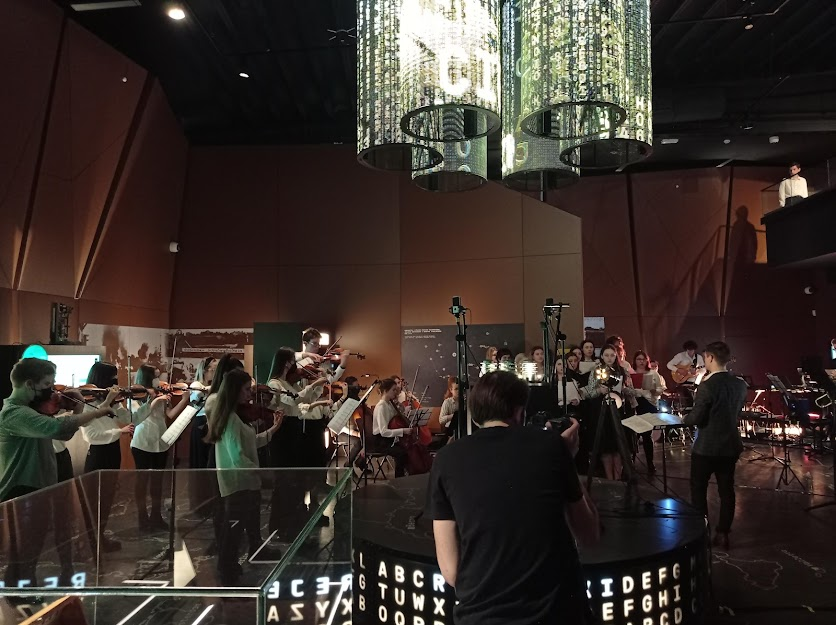
"Sub Rosa" Concert

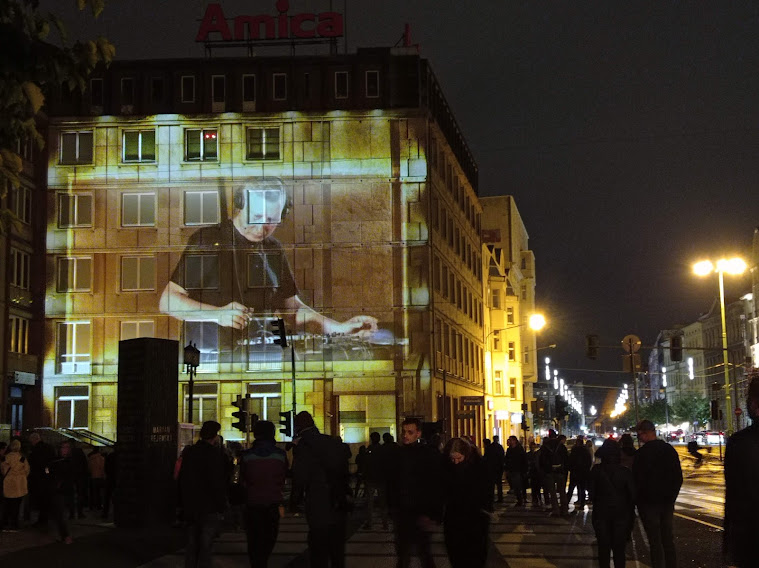
3D view on the facade of the Collegium Martineum in Poznań, during the opening of the Enigma Cipher Centre, the music band Skalpel
