= Reflector (cipher machine) =

A reflector, in cryptology, is a component of some rotor cipher machines, such as the Enigma machine, that sends electrical impulses that have reached it from the machine's rotors, back in reverse order through those rotors. The reflector simplified using the same machine setup for encryption and decryption, but it creates a weakness in the encryption: with a reflector the encrypted version of a given letter can never be that letter itself. That limitation aided World War II code breakers in cracking Enigma encryption. The comparable WWII U.S. cipher machine, SIGABA, did not include a reflector.

The scrambling action of the Enigma rotors shown for two consecutive letters — current is passed into set of rotors, around the reflector, and back out through the rotors again. Note: The greyed-out lines represent other possible circuits within each rotor, which are hard-wired to contacts on each rotor. Letter A encrypts differently with consecutive key presses, first to G, and then to C. This is because the right hand rotor has stepped, sending the signal on a completely different route.

== Other names ==
The reflector is also known as the reversing drum or, from the German, the Umkehrwalze or UKW.

== History and development ==
The reflector was invented by Willi Korn, an engineer working at Arthur Scherbius's firm, Chiffriermaschinen Aktiengesellschaft (ChiMaAG). It was first integrated into the commercial Enigma "Glow Lamp" model (Enigma A). The component was adopted to replace the heavy printing mechanisms used in earlier rotor designs, which allowed the machine to be lighter and more compact for military field operations.
