= Jerzy Różycki =

Polish mathematician and cryptologist (1909–1942)

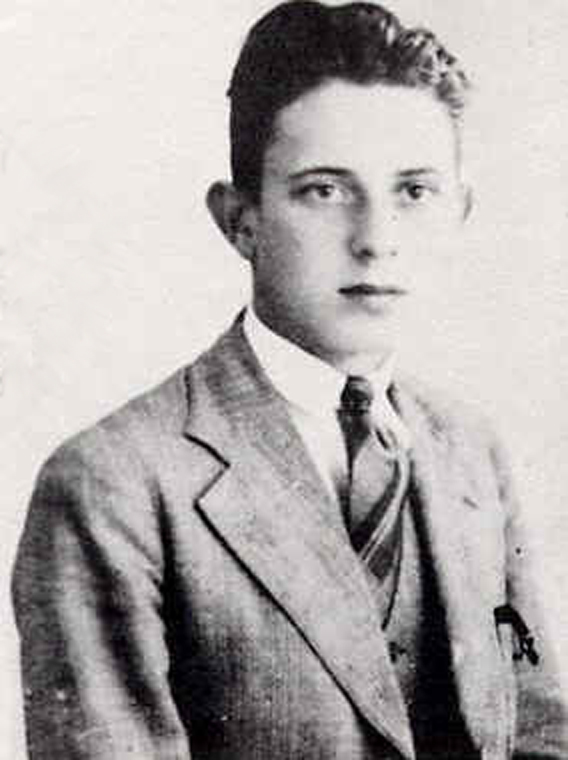
- Jerzy Różycki ca. 1928, some 4 years before joining the Cipher Bureau
- Born: 24 July 1909; Olszana, Russian Empire (now Vilshana, Cherkasy Oblast, Ukraine)
- Died: 9 January 1942 (aged 32); Mediterranean Sea
- Occupations: Mathematician, cryptologist
- Known for: Solving the Enigma-machine cipher
- Awards: Order of Polonia Restituta, Grand Cross (2000); IEEE Milestone Award (2014)

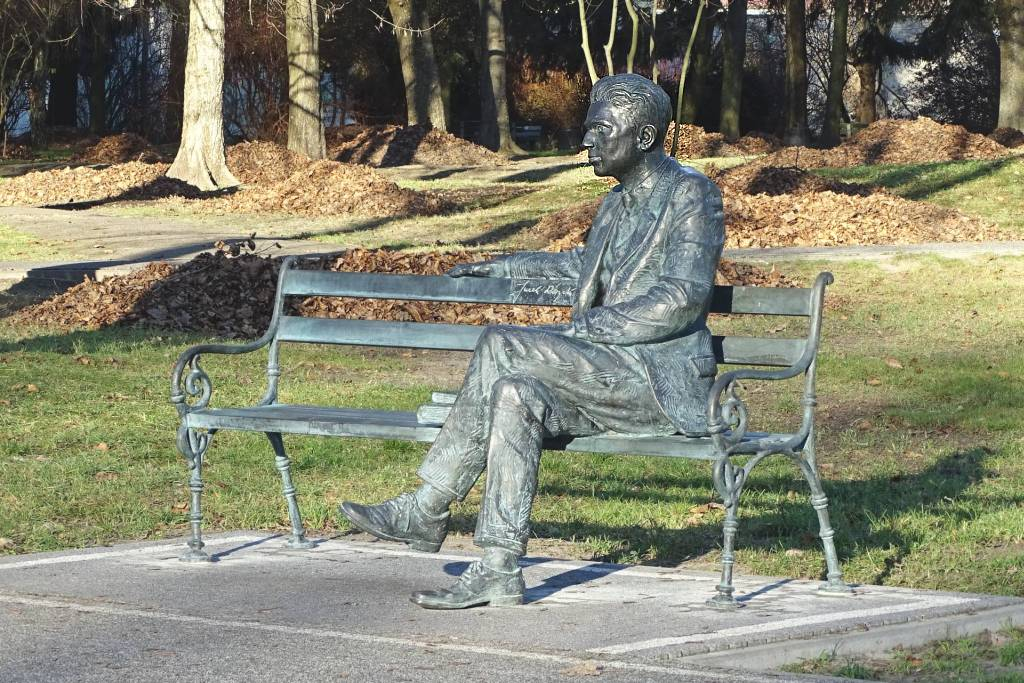
Jerzy Różycki memorial bench in Wyszków, near Warsaw

Jerzy Witold Różycki (pronounced [ˈjɛʒɨ ruˈʒɨt͡ski]; 24 July 1909 – 9 January 1942) was a Polish mathematician and cryptologist who worked at breaking German Enigma-machine ciphers before and during World War II.

== Life ==
Różycki was born in what is now Ukraine, the fourth and youngest child of Zygmunt Różycki, a pharmacist and graduate of Saint Petersburg University, and Wanda, née Benita. He attended a Polish school in Kiev before moving with his family to Poland in 1918. In 1926 he completed secondary school at Wyszków on eastern Poland's Bug River.

Różycki studied mathematics from 1927 to 1932 in western Poland, at Poznań University's Mathematics Institute, graduating with a master's degree on February 19, 1932. He would later earn a second master's degree from Poznań University, in geography, on December 13, 1937.

In 1929, while still a student, Różycki, proficient in German, was one of twenty-odd Poznań University mathematics students who accepted an invitation to attend a secret cryptology course organized at a nearby military installation by the Polish General Staff's Cipher Bureau, headquartered in Warsaw.

From September 1932, Różycki served as a civilian cryptologist with the Polish General Staff's Cipher Bureau, housed till 1937 in Warsaw's Saxon Palace. He worked there together with fellow Poznań University mathematics alumni and Cipher Bureau cryptology-course graduates Marian Rejewski and Henryk Zygalski.

After Rejewski had reconstructed the German military Enigma machine in December 1932, Różycki and Zygalski likewise worked at ongoing development of methods and equipment to exploit Enigma decryption as a source of intelligence. Różycki invented the "clock" method, which sometimes made it possible to determine which of the machine's rotors was at the far right, that is, in the position where the rotor always revolved at every depression of a key.

On 9 January 1942, Różycki perished in the Mediterranean Sea while returning to the Cadix center, near Uzès in Vichy France, from a stint at Cadix's branch office at the Château Couba on the outskirts of Algiers. His passenger ship, the SS Lamoricière, sank in unclear circumstances near the Balearic Islands. Fellow victims of the disaster, among the 222 passengers killed, included Piotr Smoleński and Captain Jan Graliński, of the prewar Polish Cipher Bureau's Russian section, and a French officer accompanying the three Poles, Captain François Lane.

Różycki has a cenotaph (symbolic grave) in the National Pantheon at the Saints Peter and Paul Church in Kraków, Poland.

== Family ==
In 1938, aged 29, Różycki married Maria Barbara Mayka. Their son, Janusz Różycki, born May 10, 1939, completed his studies at the Academy of Fine Arts in Warsaw and went on to be a member of the Polish fencing team that won a silver medal at the 1964 Tokyo Olympics.

== Recognition ==
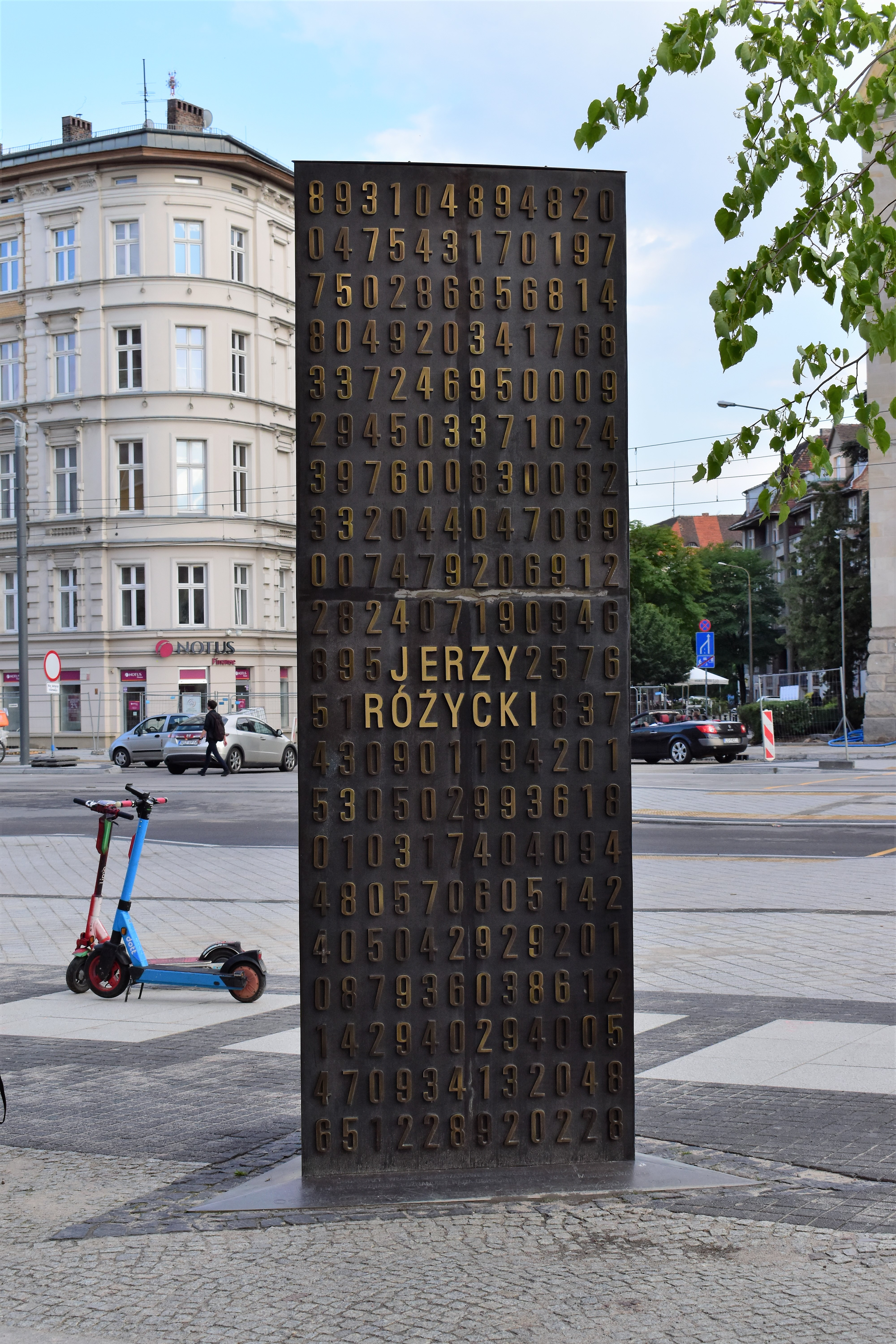
2007 monument to cryptologists Rejewski, Różycki, and Zygalski in front of the Imperial Castle in Poznań

In 1980 Różycki and his two mathematician colleagues were among the heroes of Sekret Enigmy (The Enigma Secret), a Polish thriller film about their solution of the German Enigma cipher. Late 1980 also saw a similarly-themed Polish TV series, Tajemnice Enigmy (The Secrets of Enigma).

On 21 February 2000, Polish President Aleksander Kwaśniewski posthumously awarded Różycki the Grand Cross of the Order of Polonia Restituta for outstanding contributions to his homeland.

In 2007 a three-sided memorial was unveiled before the Imperial Castle in Poznań, commemorating the three mathematician-cryptologists (Rejewski, Różycki and Zygalski), alumni of the University of Poznań, who reconstructed the German Enigma machine and developed methods of breaking Enigma ciphers, thus contributing to subsequent Allied victory in World War II.

In 2009 the Polish Post issued a series of four commemorative stamps, one of which pictured Różycki and fellow mathematician-cryptologists Marian Rejewski and Henryk Zygalski.

On 5 August 2014 the Institute of Electrical and Electronics Engineers (IEEE) posthumously honored Rejewski, Różycki, and Zygalski with its Milestone Award, given for "First Breaking of Enigma Code by the Team of Polish Cipher Bureau, 1932-1939". The three had built the 'bomba' – the first cryptanalytic machine to break codes. Their work was a foundation of British code breaking efforts which, with later American assistance, helped end World War II. In 2014 a commemorative plaque in Polish and English, dedicated to Różycki and his two colleagues, was unveiled before the Polish Academy of Sciences Mathematics Institute in Warsaw.

In 2018 a bench commemorating Różycki was unveiled in a park in the town of Wyszków, where Różycki had attended secondary school.

In 2021 the Enigma Cipher Centre, an educational and scientific institution dedicated to the Polish mathematicians who broke the Enigma cipher, including Jerzy Różycki, opened in Poznań.

== See also ==
- Bomba (cryptography)
- Enigma machine
- List of cryptographers
- List of Polish mathematicians
- List of Poles
- Marian Rejewski
