= Willi Korn =

German mathematician

Richard Georg Willi Korn (31 July 1893 in Rogätz; 7 May 1972 in Berlin) was a German engineer and cryptologist who made significant contributions in the first half of the 20th century to the design of the Enigma rotor cipher machine, which was used to encrypt communications of the German Wehrmacht during the Second World War. Little is know about Korn's life but his lifes work is primarily known through his inventions and associated patents.

== Life ==
The "commercial machine" of 1923 that was invented by Arthur Scherbius, did not have a reflector rotor

Little is known about Korn's life. He was 15 years younger than Arthur Scherbius (1878–1929), the inventor of the Enigma. To manufacture this machine, the Chiffriermaschinen-Aktiengesellschaft (ChiMaAG) was founded in Berlin on 9 July 1923 (at W 35, Steglitzerstr. 2—now Pohlstraße, 10785 Tiergarten). According to Friedrich L. Bauer, Korn joined ChiMaAG in 1929.

Korn prospered in ChiMaAG becoming an inventor, leading to number of improvements in security for the Enigma. The first was invention of the reflector (UKW). At that time, only early Enigma models existed—such as the "commercial machine" and the "printing Enigma"— which lacked a reflector and were considered unsuitable for practical use due to their size and heavy weight. With his idea for the reflector, Korn aimed to improve the Enigma by simplifying both its operation and construction while simultaneously enhancing its cryptographic security. German Reich Patent No. 460457, titled "Ciphering device for use in ciphering machines," bears the notation "Patented in the German Reich effective March 11, 1926," and lists "Willi Korn of Berlin-Friedenau" as the inventor. Another patent by Korn took effect ten days later, on March 21, 1926; it bears the number 452194 and the title "Electrical device for ciphering and deciphering."

The first patent covers the exchange of individual rotors as well as the UKW itself. The method invented by Korn—allowing individual rotors within the rotor set to be swapped and providing additional rotors to replace those currently in the set—undoubtedly represents a significant increase in the machine's combinatorial complexity and, consequently, an improvement in the Enigma's cryptographic security.

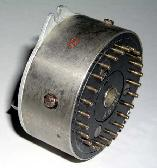
The Enigma's reflector rotor is arguably Korn's most famous invention

The second patent describes further embodiments of the reflector, such as its installation, replacement, and rotation during the encryption process. Since the patents were granted in March 1926, it can be assumed that Korn conceived the idea for the reflector significantly earlier—likely as early as 1924 or even before. The Enigma C, the first "lamp-equipped Enigma," was also the first machine to feature a reflector. Almost all subsequent Enigma models—particularly those deployed during the war years, up to and including the Enigma M4—incorporated a reflector. In the second patent specification, Korn explains the advantages of his invention as follows: "This return flow of current through the set of cipher rotors results in further scrambling. Thanks to this arrangement, it is possible to manage with relatively few cipher rotors while still maintaining a high level of encryption security." This appears to be correct, as the current now passes through the rotors twice. In fact, the reflector made the encryption process involutory; this means that if, with the rotors in a specific position, a 'U' is encrypted as an 'X', then an 'X' is likewise encrypted as a 'U' in that same position. This simplified both the operation and the design of the machine, as there was no longer a need to distinguish between encryption and decryption modes. However, the anticipated increase in cryptographic security proved to be a fallacy with far-reaching consequences.

In 1928, Korn invented the "locking ring" (later known as ring settings, "Ringstellungen"), an effective cryptographic improvement to the machine. This invention originated clearly with him and not—as has been incorrectly reported on several occasions—with his colleague Paul Bernstein In the years leading up to 1930, Korn was granted further patents covering other, mostly practical improvements to cipher machines. According to a post-war American report on the Cipher Department of the High Command of the Wehrmacht (OKW/Chi), Korn later collaborated on the further development of the Enigma with Wilhelm Fenner, the department's head of OKW/Chi.

During World War II, Korn—then chief engineer at Heimsoeth and Rinke (the successor company to ChiMaAG since 1934)—also worked on other innovative cipher machines, such as the Schlüsselgerät 41 (SG-41). According to a 1946 report by the US Army Security Agency, this machine would likely have been virtually unbreakable. However, due to technical and supply issues, it never saw field deployment.

Willi Korn survived World War II and died in West Berlin at the age of 78.
