= Zygalski sheets =

Cryptologic technique used in World War II

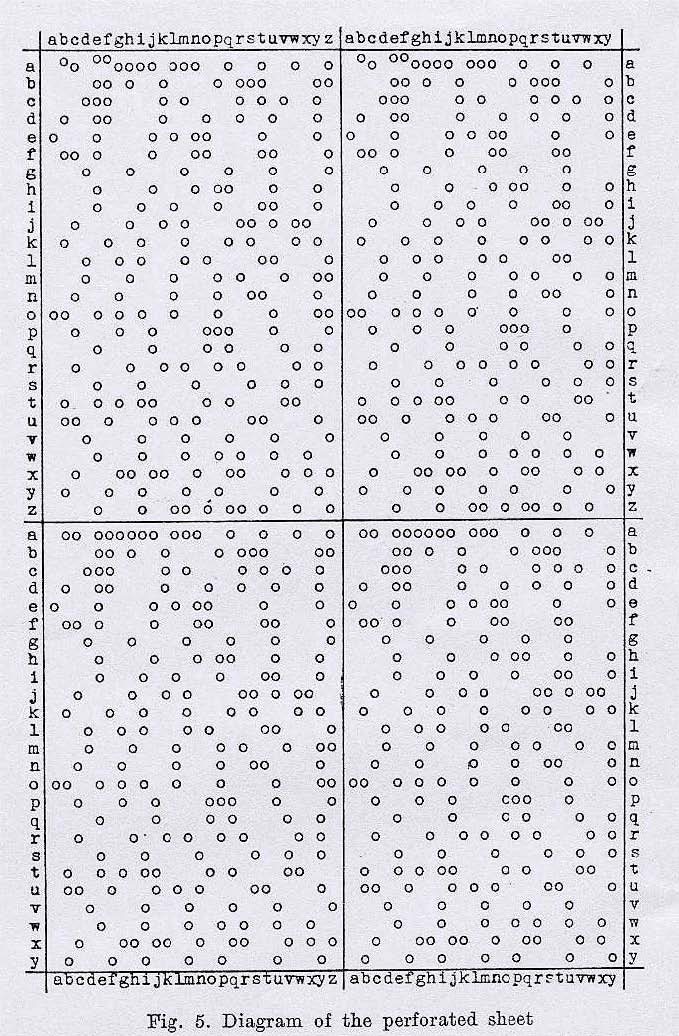
A Zygalski sheet

The method of Zygalski sheets was a cryptologic technique used by the Polish Cipher Bureau before and during World War II, and during the war also by British cryptologists at Bletchley Park, to decrypt messages enciphered on German Enigma machines.

The Zygalski-sheet apparatus takes its name from Polish Cipher Bureau mathematician–cryptologist Henryk Zygalski, who invented it about October 1938.

== Method ==
Zygalski's device comprised a set of 26 perforated sheets for each of the, initially, six possible sequences for inserting the three rotors into the Enigma machine's scrambler. Each sheet related to the starting position of the left (slowest-moving) rotor.

The 26 × 26 matrix represented the 676 possible starting positions of the middle and right rotors and was duplicated horizontally and vertically: a–z, a–y. The sheets were punched with holes in the positions that would allow a "female" to occur.

Polish mathematician–cryptologist Marian Rejewski writes about how the perforated-sheets device was operated:

When the sheets were superposed and moved in the proper sequence and the proper manner with respect to each other, in accordance with a strictly defined program, the number of visible apertures gradually decreased. And, if a sufficient quantity of data was available, there finally remained a single aperture, probably corresponding to the right case, that is, to the solution. From the position of the aperture one could calculate the order of the rotors, the setting of their rings, and, by comparing the letters of the cipher keys with the letters in the machine, likewise permutation S; in other words, the entire cipher key.

Like Rejewski's "card-catalog" method, developed using his "cyclometer", the Zygalski-sheet procedure was independent of the number of plugboard plug connections in the Enigma machine.

== Manufacture ==
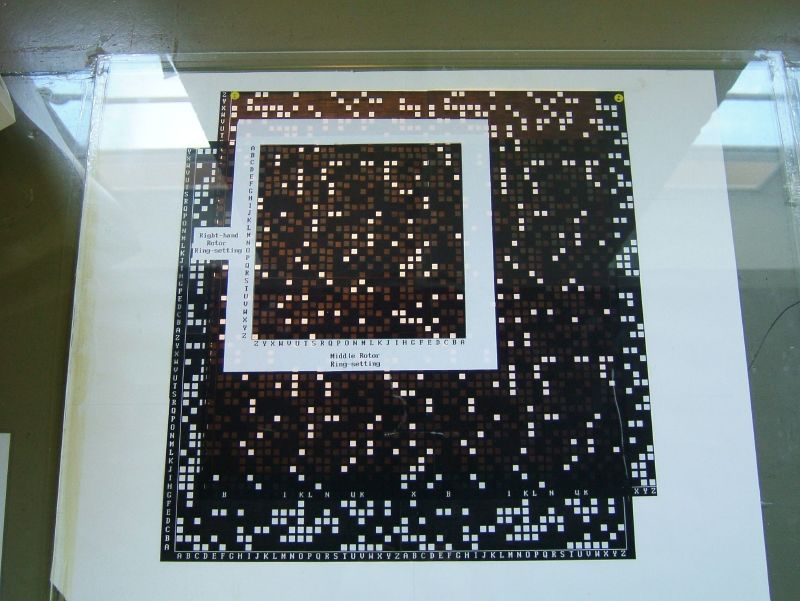
Demonstration of two perforated sheets at Bletchley Park Museum

The Cipher Bureau's manual manufacture of the sheets, which for security reasons was done by the mathematician-cryptologists themselves, using razor blades, was very time-consuming. By 15 December 1938 only a third of the job had been finished.

On that date, the Germans introduced rotors IV and V, thus increasing the labor of making the sheets tenfold, since ten times as many sheets were now needed (for the now 60 possible combinations of sequences, in an Enigma machine, of 3 rotors selected from among the now 5).

On 25 July 1939, five weeks before the outbreak of World War II, the Polish General Staff's Cipher Bureau disclosed to their French and British allies, at Warsaw, their cryptologic achievements in breaking Enigma ciphers. Part of the disclosures involved Zygalski's "perforated-sheet" method.

The British, at Bletchley Park, near London, England, undertook the production of two complete sets of perforated sheets. The work was done, with the aid of perforators, by a section headed by John R. F. Jeffreys. The sheets were known at Bletchley as Netz (from Netzverfahren, "net method"), though they were later remembered by Gordon Welchman as "Jeffreys sheets"; the latter term, however, referred to another catalog produced by Jeffreys' section.

The first set was completed in late December 1939. On 28 December part of the second set was delivered to the Polish cryptologists, who had by then escaped from German-overrun Poland to PC Bruno outside Paris, France. The remaining sheets were completed on 7 January 1940, and were couriered by Alan Turing to France shortly thereafter. "With their help," writes Rejewski, "we continued solving Enigma daily keys." The sheets were used by the Poles to make the first wartime decryption of an Enigma message, on 17 January 1940.

In May 1940, the Germans once again completely changed the procedure for enciphering message keys (with the exception of a Norwegian network). As a result, Zygalski's sheets were of no use, though the Herivel tip could still be used.

== See also ==
- Cryptanalysis of the Enigma
- Bomba ("cryptologic bomb"): machine designed about October 1938 by Marian Rejewski to facilitate the retrieval of Enigma keys
- Bombe: a machine, inspired by Rejewski's "cryptologic bomb", that was used by British and American cryptologists during World War II
- Grille (cryptography)
- Punched card
- Jacquard loom
