= Henryk Zygalski =

Polish mathematician and cryptologist (1908–1978)

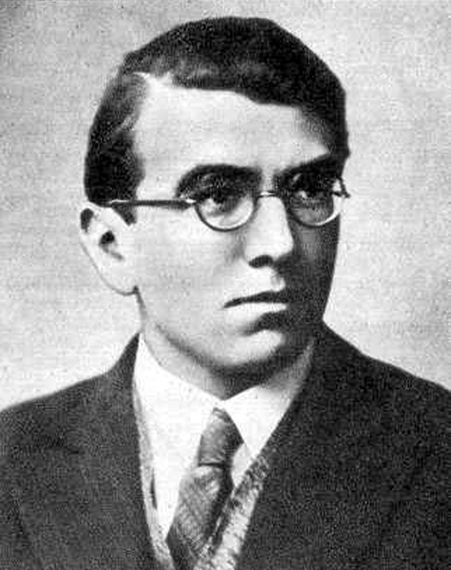
- Henryk Zygalski about 1930
- Born: 15 July 1908; Posen, German Empire (now Poznań, Poland)
- Died: 30 August 1978 (aged 70); Liss, England
- Occupations: Mathematician, cryptologist
- Known for: Solving Enigma-machine ciphers Zygalski sheets
- Awards: Order of Polonia Restituta, Grand Cross (2000); IEEE Milestone Award (2014)

Henryk Zygalski (Polish pronunciation: [ˈxɛnrɨk zɨˈɡalski]; 15 July 1908 – 30 August 1978) was a Polish mathematician and cryptologist who worked at breaking German Enigma-machine ciphers before and during World War II.

== Life ==
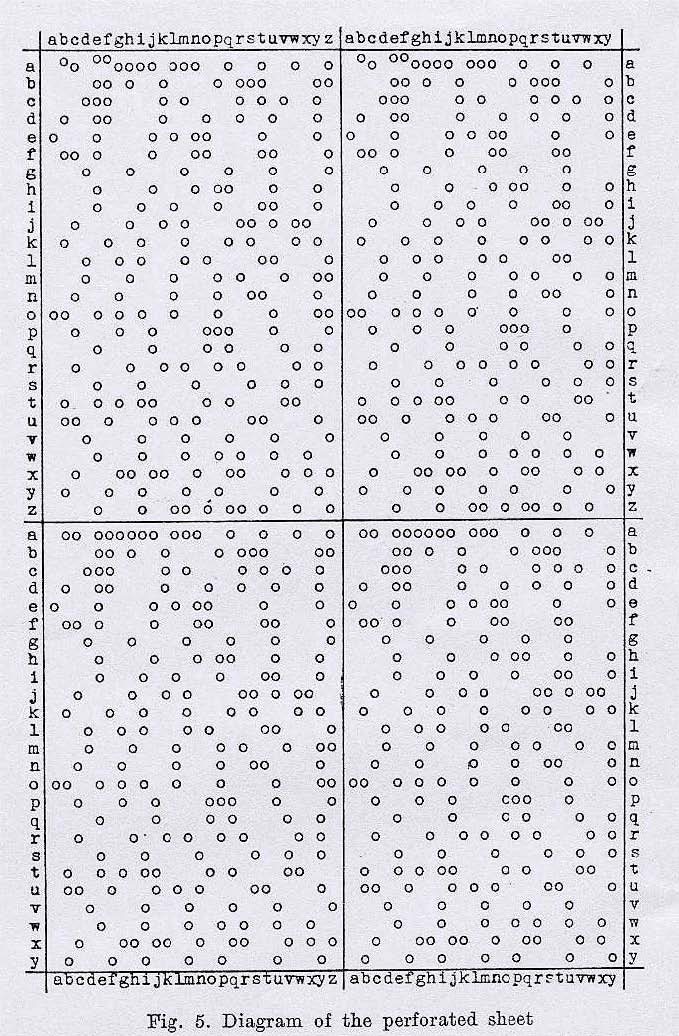
Zygalski sheet

Zygalski was born on 15 July 1908 in Posen, German Empire (now Poznań, Poland). He was, from September 1932, a civilian cryptologist with the Polish General Staff's Biuro Szyfrów (Cipher Bureau), housed in the Saxon Palace in Warsaw. He worked there with fellow Poznań University alumni and Cipher Bureau cryptology-course graduates Marian Rejewski and Jerzy Różycki. Together they developed methods and equipment for breaking Enigma messages.

In late 1938, in response to growing complexities in German encryption procedures, Zygalski designed the "perforated sheets," also known as "Zygalski sheets," a manual device for finding Enigma settings. This scheme, like the earlier "card catalog," was independent of the number of connections being used in the Enigma's plugboard, or commutator.

After the war, he remained in exile in the United Kingdom and worked, until his retirement, as a lecturer in mathematical statistics at the University of Surrey. During this period he was prevented by the Official Secrets Act from speaking of his achievements in cryptology.

He died on 30 August 1978 in Liss, England. He was cremated and his ashes taken to London.

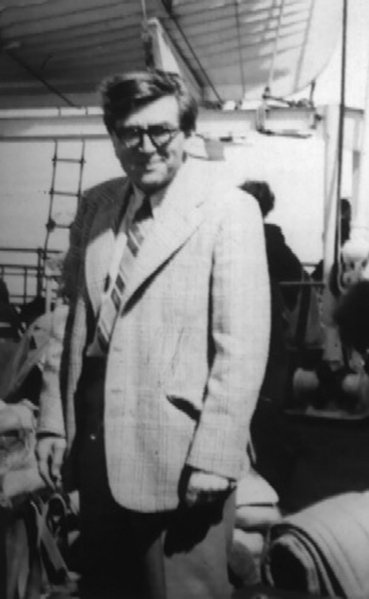
Zygalski in later life

== Recognition ==
Shortly before his death, Zygalski was honored by the Polish University in Exile with an honorary doctorate for his role in breaking Enigma.

In 2000 he was posthumously awarded by President Aleksander Kwaśniewski the Grand Cross of the Order of Polonia Restituta for his "outstanding contributions to the Republic of Poland".

In 2009 the Polish Post issued a commemorative stamp featuring Henryk Zygalski alongside fellow cryptologists Marian Rejewski and Jerzy Różycki.

On 5 August 2014 the Institute of Electrical and Electronics Engineers (IEEE) honored Rejewski, Różycki, and Zygalski with its prestigious Milestone Award, which recognizes achievements that have changed the world. Milestones was given for "First Breaking of Enigma Code by the Team of Polish Cipher Bureau, 1932-1939", they built the bomba which was the first cryptanalytic machine to break codes. Their work was a foundation of British code breaking efforts which, with later American assistance, helped end World War II.

In 2021 the Enigma Cipher Centre, an educational and scientific institution dedicated to the Polish mathematicians who broke the Enigma cipher, including Henryk Zygalski, opened in Poznań.

== See also ==
- Cryptanalysis of the Enigma
- List of cryptographers
- List of Polish mathematicians
