= Bomba (cryptography) =

Polish decryption device

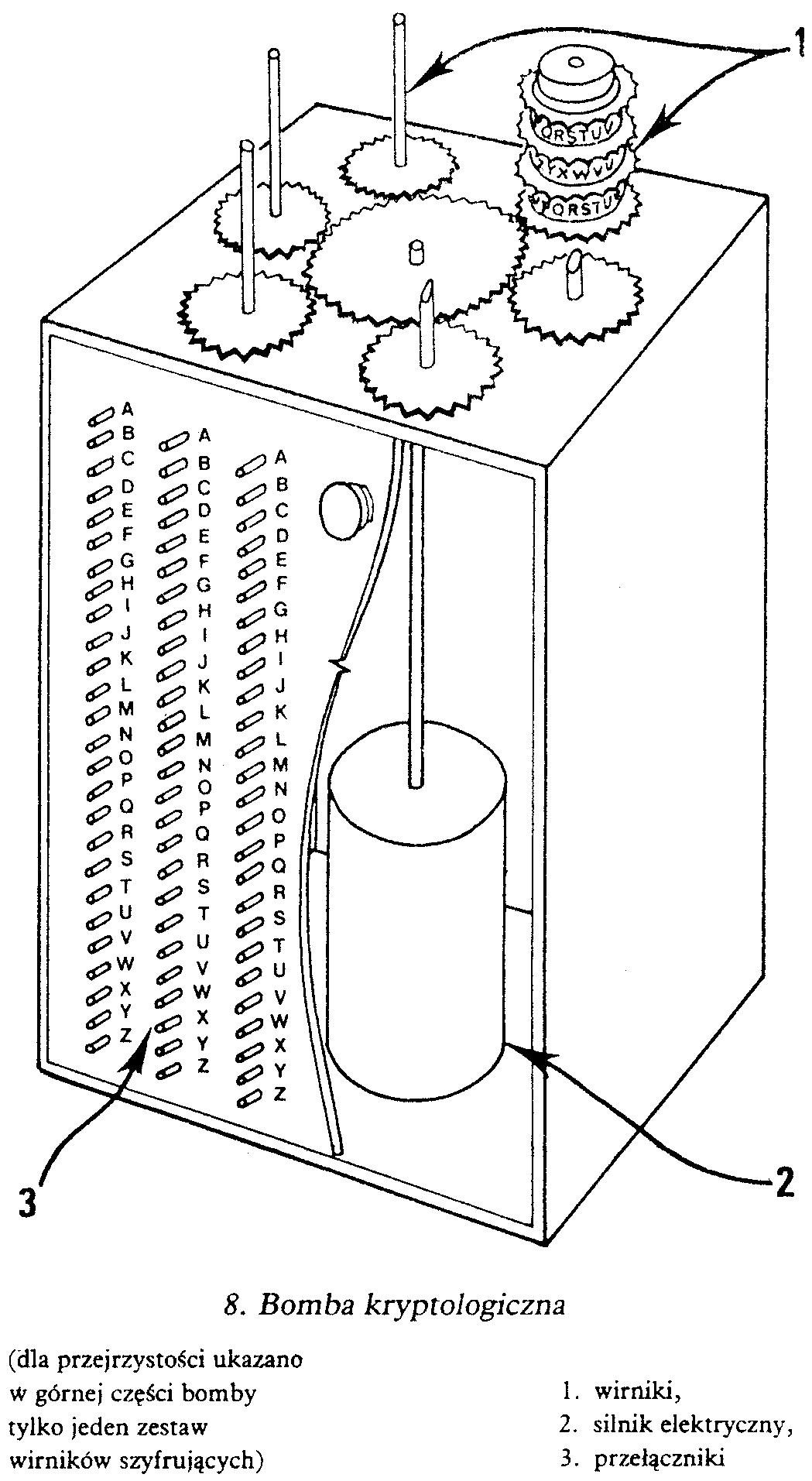
Diagram of Rejewski's cryptologic bomb. For clarity, only one set of three rotors is shown (1); in reality, there were six such sets. An electric motor (2) turns the rotors. 3: Switches.

The bomba, or bomba kryptologiczna (Polish for "bomb" or "cryptologic bomb"), was a special-purpose machine designed around October 1938 by Polish Cipher Bureau cryptologist Marian Rejewski to break German Enigma-machine ciphers.

== Etymology ==
How the machine came to be called a "bomb" has been an object of fascination and speculation. One theory, most likely apocryphal, originated with Polish engineer and army officer Tadeusz Lisicki (who knew Rejewski and his colleague Henryk Zygalski in wartime Britain but was never associated with the Cipher Bureau). He claimed that Jerzy Różycki (the youngest of the three Enigma cryptologists, and who had died in a Mediterranean passenger-ship sinking in January 1942) named the "bomb" after an ice-cream dessert of that name. This story seems implausible, since Lisicki had not known Różycki.

Rejewski himself stated that the device had been dubbed a "bomb" "for lack of a better idea".

Perhaps the most credible explanation is given by a Cipher Bureau technician, Czesław Betlewski: workers at B.S.-4, the Cipher Bureau's German section, christened the machine a "bomb" (also, alternatively, a "washing machine" or a "mangle") because of the characteristic muffled noise that it produced when operating.

A top-secret U.S. Army report dated 15 June 1945 stated:

A machine called the "bombe" is used to expedite the solution. The first machine was built by the Poles and was a hand operated multiple enigma machine. When a possible solution was reached a part would fall off the machine onto the floor with a loud noise. Hence the name "bombe".

The U.S. Army's above description of the Polish bomba is both vague and inaccurate, as is clear from the device's description at the end of the second paragraph of the "History" section, below: "Each bomb ... essentially constituted an electrically powered aggregate of six Enigmas ...". Determination of a solution involved no disassembly ("a part ... fall[ing] off") of the device.

== Background ==
The German Enigma used a combination key to control the operation of the machine: rotor order, which rotors to install, which ring setting for each rotor, which initial setting for each rotor, and the settings of the stecker plugboard. The rotor settings were trigrams (for example, "NJR") to indicate the way the operator was to set the machine. German Enigma operators were issued lists of these keys, one key for each day. For added security, however, each individual message was encrypted using an additional key modification. The operator randomly selected a trigram rotor setting for each message (for example, "PDN"). This message key would be typed twice ("PDNPDN") and encrypted, using the daily key (all the rest of those settings). At this point each operator would reset his machine to the message key, which would then be used for the rest of the message. Because the configuration of the Enigma's rotor set changed with each depression of a key, the repetition would not be obvious in the ciphertext since the same plaintext letters would encrypt to different ciphertext letters. (For example, "PDNPDN" might become "ZRSJVL.")

This procedure, which seemed reasonably secure to the Germans, was nonetheless a cryptographic malpractice, since the first insights into Enigma encryption could be inferred from seeing how the same character string was encrypted differently two times in a row.

== History ==
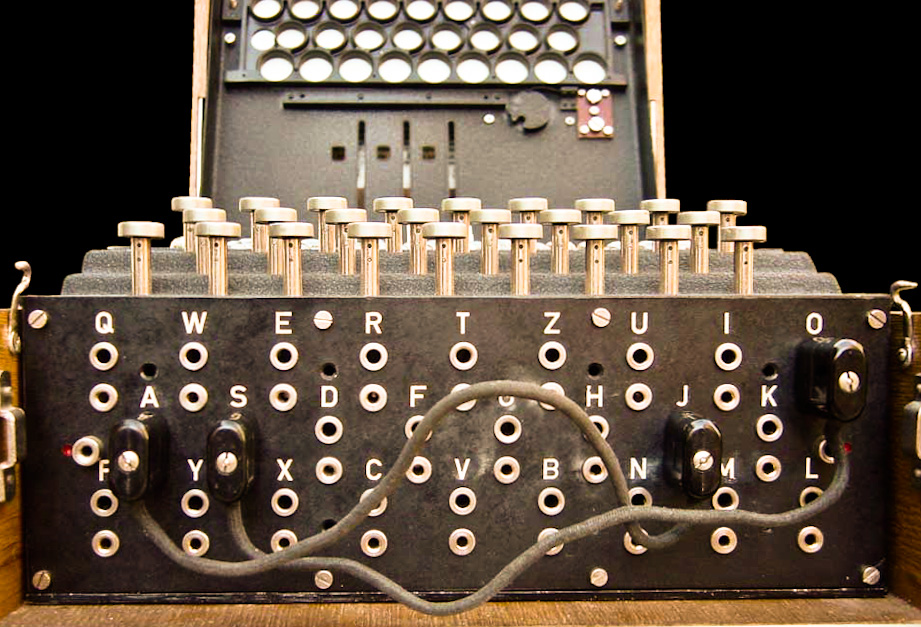
Enigma's plugboard, with two cables connected (ten were used during World War II). This enhancement greatly increased the system's security.

Using the knowledge that the first three letters of a message were the same as the second three, Polish mathematician–cryptologist Marian Rejewski was able to determine the internal wiring of the Enigma machine and thus to reconstruct the logical structure of the device. Only general traits of the machine were suspected, from the example of the commercial Enigma variant, which the Germans were known to have been using for diplomatic communications. The military versions were sufficiently different to present an entirely new problem. Having done that much, it was still necessary to check each of the potential daily keys to break an encrypted message (i.e., a "ciphertext"). With many thousands of such possible keys, and with the growing complexity of the Enigma machine and its keying procedures, this was becoming an increasingly daunting task.

In order to mechanize and speed up the process, Rejewski, a civilian mathematician working at the Polish General Staff's Cipher Bureau in Warsaw, invented the "bomba kryptologiczna" (cryptologic bomb), probably in October 1938. Each bomb (six were built in Warsaw for the Cipher Bureau before September 1939) essentially constituted an electrically powered aggregate of six Enigmas and took the place of some one hundred workers.

The bomb method was based, like the Poles' earlier "grill" method, on the fact that the plug connections in the commutator ("plugboard") did not change all the letters. But while the grill method required unchanged pairs of letters, the bomb method required only unchanged letters. Hence it could be applied even though the number of plug connections in this period was between five and eight. In mid-November 1938, the bombs were ready, and the reconstructing of daily keys now took about two hours.

Up to July 25, 1939, the Poles had been breaking Enigma messages for over six and a half years without telling their French allies. On December 15, 1938, two new rotors, IV and V, were introduced (three of the now five rotors being selected for use in the machine at a time). As Rejewski wrote in a 1979 critique of appendix 1, volume 1 (1979), of the official history of British Intelligence in the Second World War, "we quickly found the [wirings] within the [new rotors], but [their] introduction [...] raised the number of possible sequences of drums from 6 to 60 [...] and hence also raised tenfold the work of finding the keys. Thus the change was not qualitative but quantitative. We would have had to markedly increase the personnel to operate the bombs, to produce the perforated sheets (60 series of 26 sheets each were now needed, whereas up to the meeting on July 25, 1939, we had only two such series ready) and to manipulate the sheets."

Harry Hinsley suggested in British Intelligence in the Second World War that the Poles decided to share their Enigma-breaking techniques and equipment with the French and British in July 1939 because they had encountered insurmountable technical difficulties. Rejewski rejected this: "No, it was not [cryptologic] difficulties [...] that prompted us to work with the British and French, but only the deteriorating political situation. If we had had no difficulties at all we would still, or even the more so, have shared our achievements with our allies as our contribution to the struggle against Germany."

== See also ==
- Cryptanalysis of the Enigma – Decryption of World War II cipher
- Zygalski sheets – Cryptologic technique used in World War II

== Notes ==
=== Works cited ===
- Kozaczuk, Władysław (1984). Kasparek, Christopher (ed.). Enigma: How the German Machine Cipher Was Broken, and How It Was Read by the Allies in World War Two. Translated by Christopher Kasparek. Frederick, Maryland: University Publications of America. ISBN 0-89093-547-5.
