= Wahlwort =

Cryptographic term

Wahlwort (nonsense word or filler) is a cryptographic term used particularly in connection with the Wehrmacht, which used wahlworts on their Enigma rotor machine in the encryption of their communication in World War II. The term describes a randomly selected word which was inserted at the beginning or end of the radiogram plaintext. The wahlwort was intended to hinder the enemy's cryptanalysis and prevent the decryption of the ciphertext.

== Application ==
According to the secret regulations in force at that time, outlined in Der Schlüssel M - Verfahren M Allgemein (The Cipher M − M General Procedure), this procedure was used primarily to give radio messages different lengths ("Cipher M" refers to the Enigma M4, naval variant of the series of Enigma machines). Indeed, plaintexts with the same content often had to be transmitted to different receiving operators in their encrypted form. To do so they were encrypted with different keys corresponding to the different encryption networks. This resulted in ciphertexts that were different, yet had the same length. If the enemy noticed different ciphertexts of a similar length at approximately the same time, possibly from the same transmitting operator, the receiving operator would assume that a known-ciphertext-attack was taking place. The British Codebreakers from the English Bletchley Park (B. P.) were familiar with such cases and glad to receive them, naming this a kiss. Such a kiss was considered as an ideal opportunity to decipher radio messages, even better than a "Crib," a deciphered text section.

By introducing wahlworts of different lengths at the beginning or the end of the sentence, sometimes both the beginning and the end, the length of the messages differ, which prevented or at least hindered the enemy from accessing it. The length of a wahlwort was usually between four and fourteen letters. The German code book gave as examples; "Wassereimer (bucket), Fernsprecher (telephone), Eichbaum (oak tree), Dachfirst (roof ridge), Kleiderschrank (wardrobe)." Wahlworts with only three letters occasionally appeared in the code, such as ABC or XXX, but also very long compounds, such as Donaudampfschiffahrtsgesellschaftskapitän (Danube steamboating association captain) or Hottentottenpotentatentantenattentäter (Hottentot potentate aunt assassin ).

The rationale for choosing more or less meaningful German words as wahlworts (specifically compound nouns) as opposed to random text such as CIHJT UUHML, was so that the authorized recipient could verify that their deciphering of the radio message was error-free. However, according to regulations, wahlworts were required to be entirely unrelated to the content of the actual radio message, and to not "infringe on discipline and order."

Wahlworts were also used in conjunction with other ciphering machines such as the Geheimschreiber (secret teleprinter) Siemens & Halske T52.

"Introduced in 1940 on a wholesale scale, wahlworts might have knocked out the infant Crib Room before it had got properly on its feet."

== Results ==
The introduction of wahlworts, which was first observed by the British in 1942 in North Africa, impeded the codebreaker's work. However, at that time the British were so well acquainted with the German methods that there was no stopping their continued success in code-breaking, despite the wahlworts. It was a nuisance for them to have to try out the various possibilities pertaining to the word order of the text when they did not know the length of the wahlworts, but this could not stop them from deciphering the text. Post-war British review of the German wahlwort method revealed the practice to be "too little and too late". As with other German measures attempting to strengthen the cryptographic security of Enigma, for example the introduction of the cryptographically strong methods of the Enigma Uhr (clock), or the pluggable UKW D (nick-named Uncle Dick by the British), wahlworts failed because they were not introduced comprehensively and were adopted too late in the war.

== Literature ==
- John Jackson: Solving Enigma's Secrets – The Official History of Bletchley Park's Hut 6. BookTower Publishing 2014, pp 211–216, ISBN 978-0-9557164-3-0
- Tony Sale: The Bletchley Park 1944 Cryptographic Dictionary. Publikation, Bletchley Park, 2001, p 93, PDF; 0,4 MB, retrieved 24 August 2018.
