= Cryptanalysis of Italian naval codes =

Cryptanalysis of Italian naval codes during the Second World War was part of the Ultra code breaking project at Bletchley Park.

== Before the Second World War ==
Italian signals had been of interest since Italy's attack on Abyssinia in 1935. Although the UK had purchased a commercial Enigma in 1927 the leading British cryptographer, Dilly Knox only had messages he generated himself to practice with.

After Germany supplied modified commercial machines to the Nationalist side in the Spanish Civil War, and with the Italian Navy (who were also aiding the Nationalists) using the K model version of the commercial Enigma without a plugboard, Britain could intercept the radio broadcast messages.

In April 1937 Knox made his first decryption of an Enigma encryption using a technique that he called buttoning up to discover the rotor wirings and another that he called rodding to solve messages. This relied heavily on cribs and on a crossword-solver's expertise in Italian, as it yielded a limited number of spaced-out letters at a time.

== Enigma Codes ==
When Italy entered the war in 1940 an improved version of the machine was used, though little traffic was sent by it and there were "wholesale changes" in Italian codes and cyphers.

In 1940 Dilly Knox wanted to establish whether the Italian Navy were still using the same system that he had cracked during the Spanish Civil War; he instructed his assistants to use rodding to see whether the crib PERX (per being Italian for "for" and X being used to indicate a space between words) worked for the first part of the message. After three months there was no success, but Mavis Lever, a 19-year-old student, found that rodding produced PERS for the first four letters of one message. She then (against orders) tried beyond this and obtained PERSONALE (Italian for "personal"). This confirmed that the Italians were indeed using the same machines and procedures.

The subsequent breaking of Italian naval Enigma ciphers led to substantial Allied successes. The cipher-breaking was disguised by sending a reconnaissance aircraft to the known location of a warship before attacking it, so that the Italians assumed that this was how they had been discovered.

== Battle of Cape Matapan ==
The Royal Navy's victory at the Battle of Cape Matapan in March 1941 was considerably helped by Ultra intelligence obtained from Italian naval Enigma signals. Ships of the Royal Navy and Royal Australian Navy, under the command of Admiral Sir Andrew Cunningham, intercepted and sank or severely damaged several Italian ships.

For reasons of secrecy, code breakers at the GC&CS were very rarely informed of the operational effects of their work, but their impact on the Battle of Cape Matapan was an exception. A few weeks after the battle, Admiral Cunningham visited Bletchley Park to congratulate codebreaker Dilly Knox and his staff, with a positive impact on morale. Mavis Batey, one of the code breakers, remembered: "Our sense of elation knew no bounds when Cunningham himself came down in person to thank and congratulate us." Admiral John Godfrey, the Director of Naval Intelligence, stated: "Tell Dilly that we have won a great victory in the Mediterranean and it is entirely due to his girls."

== Hagelin cipher ==
After the Battle of Cape Matapan, the Italian Navy started using the C-38 version of the Boris Hagelin rotor-based cipher machine, particularly with regard to convoys carrying supplies to from Europe to North Africa. As a consequence, J. R. M. Butler recruited his former student Bernard Willson to join a team with two others in Hut 4. In June 1941, Willson achieved the first decryption of a message enciphered with the Hagelin machine. Hagelin decrypts enabled the Royal Navy and Royal Air Force to intercept the convoys and sink many ships. Enigma decrypts revealed how this deprived Axis forces of supplies. For instance, between May and September 1941, the stock of fuel for the Luftwaffe in North Africa was reduced by 90 per cent.

== Sources ==
- Erskine, Ralph; Smith, Michael, eds. (2011), The Bletchley Park Codebreakers, Biteback Publishing Ltd, ISBN 978-1-84954-078-0
- Hinsley, Harry (1996) [1993], The Influence of ULTRA in the Second World War Transcript of a lecture given on Tuesday 19 October 1993 at Cambridge University
- Hinsley, F. H.; Stripp, Alan, eds. (1993) [1992], Codebreakers: The inside story of Bletchley Park, Oxford: Oxford University Press, ISBN 978-0-19-280132-6
- Hodges, Andrew (1983), Alan Turing: The Enigma (1992 ed.), London: Vintage, ISBN 978-0-09-911641-7
