= James Gannon =

James Gannon may refer to:

- James Gannon (author), writer and producer of documentaries
- James Gannon (politician) (1859–1924)
- Jim Gannon (born 1968), English footballer and football manager
- Jim Gannon (rugby league) (born 1977), Australian rugby league player
