= Operation Ruthless =

British World War II military deception

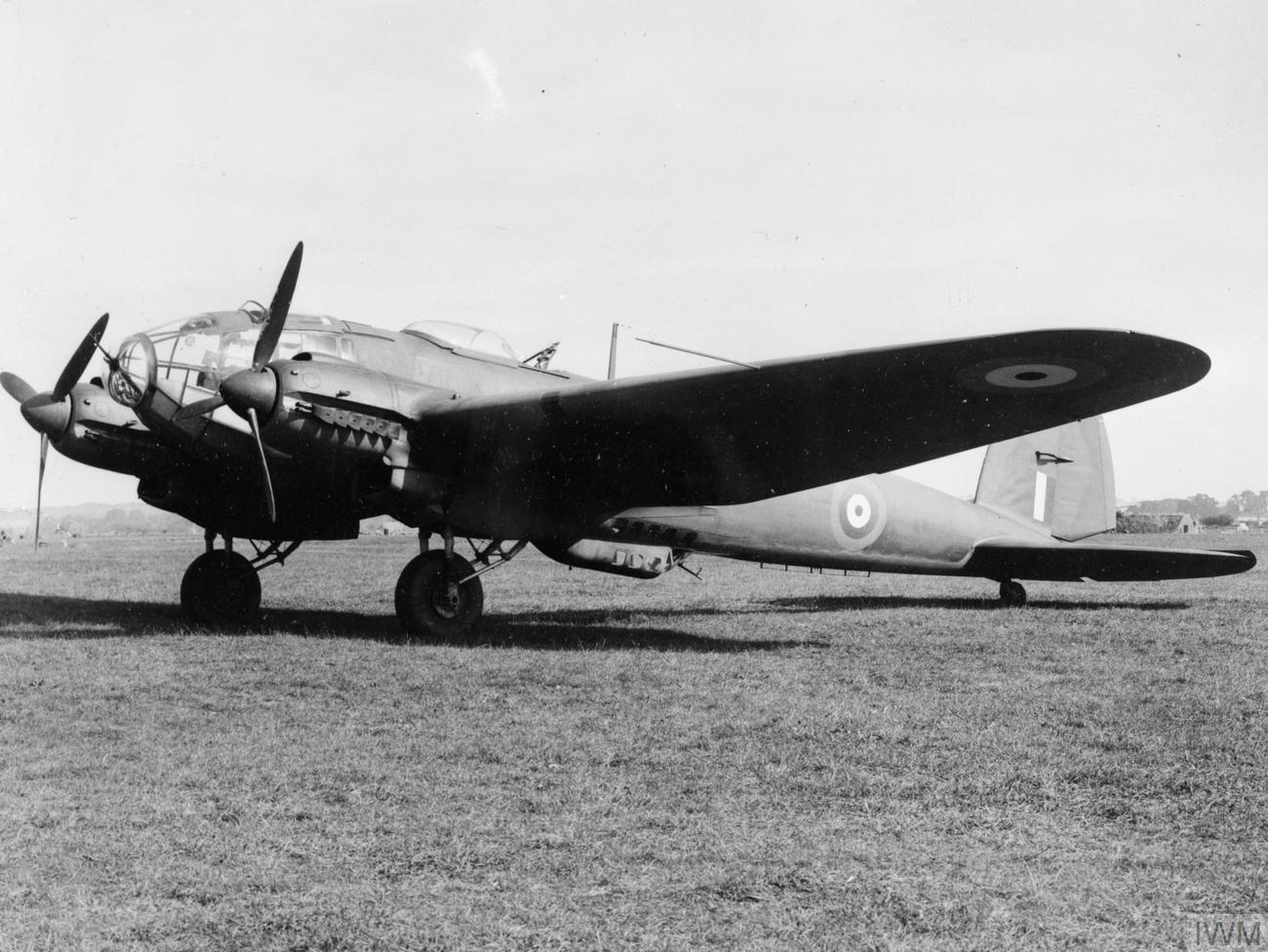
The captured Heinkel He 111, AW177, painted in RAF markings at RAF Duxford after Operation Ruthless had been abandoned (Sept-Oct 1941)

Operation Ruthless was the name of a deception operation devised by Ian Fleming in the British Admiralty during World War II, in an attempt to gain access to German Naval Enigma codebooks.

== Background ==
With the help of their Polish allies, British codebreakers at Bletchley Park had considerable success in decoding the Enigma-enciphered traffic of the German air force, army and intelligence and counter-espionage service (Abwehr), but had made little progress with German naval messages. The methods of communicating the choice and starting positions, of Enigma's rotors, the indicator, were much more complex for naval messages. In 1940 Dilly Knox, the veteran World War I codebreaker, Frank Birch, head of Bletchley Park's German Naval Department, and the two leading codebreakers, Alan Turing and Peter Twinn knew that getting hold of the German Navy Enigma documentation was their best chance of making progress in breaking the code.

The Royal Navy's Operational Intelligence Centre (OIC) was a leading user of Ultra intelligence from Bletchley Park's decrypts. Lieutenant Commander Ian Fleming of the Admiralty's Naval Intelligence Division, who later wrote the James Bond novels, was the personal assistant to the Director of Naval Intelligence, Rear Admiral John Godfrey. Fleming liaised with the naval department at Bletchley Park, visiting about twice a month, and was well aware of this problem.

== The plan ==
On 12 September 1940, Fleming wrote a note to Godfrey which read:

I suggest we obtain the loot by the following means:

1. Obtain from Air Ministry an air-worthy German bomber.
2. Pick a tough crew of five, including a pilot, W/T operator and word-perfect German speaker. Dress them in German Air Force uniform, add blood and bandages to suit.
3. Crash plane in the Channel after making S.O.S. to rescue service in P/L.
4. Once aboard rescue boat, shoot German crew, dump overboard, bring rescue boat back to English port.
In order to increase the chances of capturing an R. or M. with, its richer booty, the crash might be staged in mid-Channel. The Germans would presumably employ one of this type for the longer and more hazardous journey.

F. 12.9-40.

The plan was that the German bomber would follow on behind aircraft returning from a night bombing raid. When crossing the middle of the English Channel, it would cut one engine and lose height with smoke pouring from a 'candle' in the tail, send out a SOS distress signal and then ditch in the sea. The crew would then take to a rubber dinghy, having ensured that the bomber sank before the Germans could identify it, and wait to be rescued by a German naval vessel. When on board the 'survivors' would then kill the German crew, and hijack the ship, thus obtaining the Enigma documentation.

A Heinkel He 111 was available for this operation. The aircraft, Werk Nr. 6853, had been captured in airworthy condition after being operated by the German bomber unit, Kampfgeschwader 26. On 9 February 1940, it had made a forced landing near North Berwick Law after being damaged by a Spitfire over the Firth of Forth. It was subsequently assigned the Royal Air Force serial number AW177 and flown by the RAF's Air Fighting Development Unit and 1426 Flight.

Fleming had proposed himself as one of the crew but, as someone who knew about Bletchley Park, he could not be placed at risk of being captured. The aircraft was prepared with an aircrew of German-speaking Englishmen. The operation was planned for the early part of the month because it was known that the code sheets were changed at the start of each month.

== Outcome ==
Fleming took his team to Dover to await the next suitable bombing raid, but aerial reconnaissance and wireless telegraphy monitoring failed to find any suitable German vessels, and the operation was called off. That this was a major disappointment to the codebreakers can be judged by what Frank Birch wrote in a letter dated 20 October 1940.

Turing and Twinn came to me like undertakers cheated of a nice corpse two days ago, all in a stew about the cancellation of operation Ruthless. The burden of their song was the importance of a pinch.

An alternative account of why the operation did not take place was given when his niece, Lucy Fleming, visited his old office in the Admiralty. The Bond Correspondence, a BBC Radio 4 radio programme broadcast on 24 May 2008, includes an interview there. Her subject in the Admiralty says that the idea was that the Germans would see the floating bomber and the "survivors" and send out a rescue vessel; but someone at the RAF pointed out that a downed Heinkel bomber would sink rather than float.
