= Gardening (cryptanalysis) =

Schemes to entice the Germans to include known plaintext during World War II

In cryptanalysis, gardening is the act of encouraging a target to use known plaintext in an encrypted message, typically by performing some action the target is sure to report. It was a term used during World War II at the British Government Code and Cypher School at Bletchley Park, England, for schemes to entice the Germans to include particular words – which the British called "cribs" – in their encrypted messages. This term presumably came from RAF minelaying missions, or "gardening" sorties. "Gardening" was standard RAF slang for sowing mines in rivers, ports and oceans from low heights, possibly because each sea area around the European coasts was given a code-name of flowers or vegetables.

The technique is claimed to have been most effective against messages produced by the German Navy's Enigma machines. If the Germans had recently swept a particular area for mines, and analysts at Bletchley Park were in need of some cribs, they might (and apparently did on several occasions) request that the area be mined again. This would hopefully evoke encrypted messages from the local command mentioning Minen (German for mines), the location, and perhaps messages also from the headquarters with minesweeping ships to assign to that location, mentioning the same. It worked often enough to try several times.

This crib-based decryption is usually not considered a chosen-plaintext attack, even though plain text effectively chosen by the British was injected into the ciphertext, because the choice was very limited and the cryptanalysts did not care what the crib was so long as they knew it. Most chosen-plaintext cryptanalysis requires very specific patterns (e.g. long repetitions of "AAA...", "BBB...", "CCC...", etc.) which could not be mistaken for normal messages. It does, however, show that the boundary between these two is somewhat fuzzy.

Another notable example occurred during the lead-up to the Battle of Midway. U.S. cryptanalysts had decrypted numerous Japanese messages about a planned operation at "AF", but the code word "AF" came from a second location code book which was not known. Suspecting it was Midway Island, they arranged for the garrison there to report in the clear about a breakdown of their desalination plant. A Japanese report about "AF" being short of fresh water soon followed, confirming the guess.

== See also ==
- Cryptanalysis of the Enigma
- Known-plaintext attack
