= Kiss (cryptanalysis) =

In cryptanalysis, a kiss is a pair of identical messages sent using different ciphers, one of which has been broken. The term was used at Bletchley Park during World War II. A deciphered message in the breakable system provided a "crib" (piece of known plaintext) which could then be used to read the unbroken messages. One example was where messages read in a German meteorological cipher could be used to provide cribs for reading the difficult 4-wheel Naval Enigma cipher.

cribs from re-encipherments ... were known as 'kisses' in Bletchley Park parlance because the relevant signals were marked with 'xx'

== See also ==
- Cryptanalysis of the Enigma
- Known-plaintext attack
