= James Gannon (author) =

American male journalist

- Born: James Gannon
- Occupations: Author, producer

James Gannon is a freelance writer and producer of documentaries for NBC News. He has published many articles on a variety of subjects.

== Life ==
James Gannon is the author of Stealing Secrets, Telling Lies: How Spies and Codebreakers Helped Shape the Twentieth century (2001). The book discusses key episodes of 20th-century espionage and cryptology involving the Zimmermann telegram; Enigma decryption and "Ultra"; the Battle of the Atlantic; Erwin Rommel; the Colossus computer; Frank Rowlett and Japan's Purple cipher; Allied Operation Overlord deceptions; World War II spies and spy organizations; Rudolf Roessler and the Lucy Spy Ring; Takeo Yoshikawa and Japan's attack on Pearl Harbor; Joseph J. Rochefort and the Battle of Midway; Richard Sorge; Donald Maclean; Klaus Fuchs; Venona; Oleg Penkovsky; and Ryszard Kukliński.

A thread running through Gannon's book is the ubiquity of distortions in accounts of espionage and cryptology, and the readiness of unscrupulous individuals, agencies and countries to take credit for the achievements of others.

== See also ==
- Espionage
- Military intelligence
