= Known-plaintext attack =

Attack model for cryptanalysis with access to both plaintext and ciphertext

The known-plaintext attack (KPA) is an attack model for cryptanalysis where the attacker has access to both the plaintext (called a crib) and its encrypted version (ciphertext). These can be used to reveal secret keys and codebooks. The term "crib" originated at Bletchley Park, the British World War II decryption operation, which defined it:

A plain language (or code) passage of any length, usually obtained by solving one or more cipher or code messages, and occurring or believed likely to occur in a different cipher or code message, which it may provide a means of solving.

— The Bletchley Park 1944 Cryptographic Dictionary formatted by Tony Sale, 2001 (PDF), p. 22

== History ==
The usage "crib" was adapted from a slang term referring to cheating (e.g., "I cribbed my answer from your test paper"). A "crib" originally was a literal or interlinear translation of a foreign-language text, usually a Latin or Ancient Greek text, which students might be assigned to translate from the original language.

The idea behind a crib is that cryptologists were looking at incomprehensible ciphertext, but if they had a clue about some word or phrase that might be expected to be in the ciphertext, they would have a "wedge," a test to break into it. If their otherwise random attacks on the cipher managed to sometimes produce those words or (preferably) phrases, they would know they might be on the right track. When those words or phrases appeared, they would feed the settings that they had used, which revealed them back into the whole encrypted message to good effect.

In the case of Enigma, the German High Command was very meticulous about the overall security of the Enigma system and understood the possible problem of cribs. The day-to-day operators, on the other hand, were less careful. The Bletchley Park team would guess some of the plaintext, based upon when the message was sent and by recognizing routine operational messages. For instance, a daily weather report was transmitted by the Germans at the same time every day. The regimented style of military reports made it contain the word Wetter (German for "weather") at the same location in every message. (Knowing the local weather conditions helped Bletchley Park guess other parts of the plaintext as well.) Other operators, too, would send standard salutations or introductions. An officer stationed in the Qattara Depression consistently reported that he had nothing to report. "Heil Hitler," occurring at the end of a message, is another well-known example.

At Bletchley Park in World War II, strenuous efforts were made to use (and even force the Germans to produce) messages with known plaintext. For example, when cribs were lacking, Bletchley Park would sometimes ask the Royal Air Force to "seed" a particular area in the North Sea with naval mines, a process that came to be known as gardening, by obvious reference. The Enigma messages that were soon sent out would most likely contain the name of the area or the port threatened by the mines.

The Germans themselves could be very accommodating in that regard. Whenever any of the turned German Double-Cross agents sent a message (written by the British) to their respective handlers, they frequently obligingly re-encrypted the message word for word on Enigma for onward transmission to Berlin.

When a captured German revealed under interrogation that Enigma operators had been instructed to encode numbers by spelling them out, Alan Turing reviewed decrypted messages and determined that the number "eins" ("one") was the most common string in the plaintext (Benford's law). He automated the crib process by creating the Eins Catalogue, which assumed that "eins" was encoded at all positions in the plaintext. The catalogue included every possible position of the various rotors, starting positions, and keysettings of the Enigma.

The Polish Cipher Bureau had likewise exploited "cribs" in the "ANX method" before World War II (the Germans' use of "AN", German for "to", followed by "X" as a spacer to form the text "ANX").

The Americans and the British used one-time tape systems, such as the 5-UCO, for their most sensitive traffic. Those devices were immune to known-plaintext attack; however, they were point-to-point links and required massive supplies of one-time tapes. Networked cipher machines were considered vulnerable to cribs, and various techniques were used to disguise the beginning and ends of a message, including cutting messages in half and sending the second part first and adding nonsense padding at both ends. The latter practice resulted in an infamous incident during World War II in which the nonsense padding "the world wonders" was not nonsensical enough and was misinterpreted as part of the actual message, which led US Admiral William Halsey to change his plans.

The KL-7, introduced in the mid-1950s, was the first US cipher machine to be considered safe against known-plaintext attack.

Classical ciphers are typically vulnerable to known-plaintext attack. For example, a Caesar cipher can be solved using a single letter of corresponding plaintext and ciphertext to decrypt entirely. A general monoalphabetic substitution cipher needs several character pairs and some guessing if there are fewer than 26 distinct pairs.

== See also ==
- Cadix
- Cryptanalysis of the Enigma
- Kiss (cryptanalysis)
- PC Bruno
- Polish Cipher Bureau
- Ultra (cryptography)
