= Roto (disambiguation) =

Roto is a Spanish language term used in parts of South America for Chilean people.

Roto may also refer to:

- Roto, New South Wales, Australian settlement
- Roto North America, window/door hardware manufacturing and distribution company
- Rotogravure, a type of printed photograph
- Rotoscoping, animation technique
- Roto, a village on Pukapuka in the Cook Islands
- Roto, the Japanese name for Erdrick, the main character in the Dragon Quest video game franchise
- a nickname for Rotisserie League Baseball in Fantasy baseball
- a nickname for rotisserie sports, a.k.a. fantasy sports

== See also ==
- Rotor (disambiguation)
- Jesus Arriaga or Chucho el Roto (1858–1885), a legendary Tlaxcalan bandit
- Rothau
