= Rodor =

Rodor may refer to:

- Aristotle Rodor, a character in the DC Comics who invented the Question mask
- Matvei Rodor or Zuggernaut, a supervillain character in the DC comics

== See also ==
- Rotor (disambiguation)
