= Thomas J. Clark =

American inventor

Thomas Jefferson Clark (1869–1907), originally from New Hampshire, United States, was a lifelong friend and partner of John K. Stewart as they built the companies that would one day be the foundation of the Stewart-Warner Corporation of Chicago, Illinois.

Clark is probably only known today for his Clark Foot Warmers. These small automobile heaters contained coal. The coal embers would emit heat providing some relief in a time when automobiles did not have such options. The production of the coal needed for these heaters violated city smoke regulations and forced Stewart and Clark to build a new plant in Aberdeen, Illinois, about 25 miles west of Chicago.

Clark was an active partner and advisor to John Stewart up until Clark's death during the 1907 Glidden Tour. Clark was demonstrating the Stewart Speedometer during this rally style event when the Packard he was driving slid off the muddy road and into a ditch.
