= Rotor =

Rotor may refer to:

== Science and technology ==
=== Engineering ===
- Rotor (electric), the non-stationary part of an alternator or electric motor, operating with a stationary element so called the stator
- ROTOR, a former radar project in the UK following the Second World War
- Rotor (antenna)
- In mechanical engineering, the rotor is a part of a machine that rotates about its own axis.
  - Helicopter rotor, the rotary wing(s) of a rotorcraft such as a helicopter
  - Rotor (turbine), the rotor of a turbine powered by fluid pressure
  - Rotor (crank), a variable-angle bicycle crank
  - Rotor (brake), the disc of a disc brake, in U.S. terminology
  - Rotor (brake mechanism), a device that allows the handlebars and fork to revolve indefinitely without tangling the rear brake cable - see Detangler
  - Rotor (distributor), a component of the ignition system of an internal combustion engine
  - Pistonless rotary engine

=== Computing ===
- Rotor machine, the rotating wheels used in certain cipher machines, such as the German Enigma machine
  - Rotor (Enigma machine), a rotating part of the German Enigma machine
- Rotor (software project), the former code name for Microsoft's shared source implementation of its Common Language Infrastructure

=== Chemistry ===
- The rotating part of a centrifuge, which also holds the samples
- Rigid rotor, a mathematical model for rotating systems (usually molecules)

=== Medicine ===
- Rotor syndrome, a rare liver disorder

== Mathematics ==
- Rotor (mathematics), an even-graded multivector used to produce rotations and some other affine transformations
- Curl (mathematics), known as rotor in some countries, a vector operator that shows a vector field's rate of rotation

== Other uses ==
- SC Rotor Volgograd, a Russian football club
- Rotor (Sonic the Hedgehog), a fictional character from the Sonic the Hedgehog universe
- Rotor (ride), the trade name for an amusement ride
- Rotor (meteorology), a turbulent horizontal vortex that forms in the trough of lee waves
- Rotor, a space colony in Isaac Asimov's novel Nemesis
- R.O.T.O.R., a 1987 science fiction/action movie
