= John K. Stewart =

American entrepreneur and inventor

John Kerwin Stewart
- Born: November 30, 1870; Hillsborough, New Hampshire
- Died: June 1, 1916 (aged 45); New York City
- Spouse: Julia Pearl Butler
- Children: Dorthy Stewart (1899-1901), Marian Stewart (1902-1988) and Jeanne Stewart (1911-1921)
- Parent(s): John Stewart; Mary Eliza Ring

John Kerwin Stewart (November 30, 1870 – June 1, 1916) was an entrepreneur and inventor. He founded the Stewart-Warner Corporation. In his lifetime he founded or purchased several companies and held 82 patents.

== Biography ==
He was born in 1870 in Hillsborough, New Hampshire. He married Julia Pearl Butler in 1896, the couple had three daughters.

In what became training for their futures in manufacturing, Stewart and Thomas J. Clark worked at a factory in New Hampshire that produced horse clipping machinery. The lifelong friends later moved to Providence, Rhode Island, and worked for the Brown & Sharpe Manufacturing Company. Then, in approximately 1890, the two traveled to Chicago, Illinois, where they entered into partnership and manufactured horse clippers, sheep clippers, bicycle handle bars and flexible shafts among other products.

He died on June 1, 1916, in New York City.

== Companies founded ==
=== Chicago Flexible Shaft Company ===
In 1893 Stewart & Clark founded the Chicago Flexible Shaft Company (incorporated 1897) to manufacture flexible driveshafts and mechanical sheep shears. Stewart and Charles Timson of Wm. Cooper & Nephews partnered in founding the Cooper-Stewart Sheep Shearing Machinery Co in 1896 and sold the sheep shearing products through this new company.

In 1903, Wm. Cooper & Nephews purchased 50% ownership of the Chicago Flexible Shaft Company. In 1908, Wm. Cooper & Nephews purchased the remaining 50% of Chicago Flexible Shaft Company for $400,000. Julia Stewarts nephew remained the president of Chicago Flexible Shaft Company after the sale.

In 1910, the Chicago Flexible Shaft Company introduced its first home appliance, an electric iron, under the brand name Sunbeam. The Sunbeam Mixmaster was introduced in 1930. By 1946, Sunbeam appliances had become so successful and widely sold that the company name would change formally to Sunbeam Corporation.

=== Sterk Manufacturing Company ===
Around 1896 Stewart and Clark founded the Sterk Manufacturing Company which produced speedometers and automobile horns. The flexible shafts from the Chicago Flexible Shaft Company were used in the production of cables needed for the speedometers.

=== Stewart & Clark Manufacturing Company ===
In 1905 Stewart & Clark Manufacturing Company was founded and acquired all assets of the Sterk Manufacturing Company.

The partners erected a small manufacturing plant on Diversey Parkway in Chicago. This plant would eventually grow to a one million square foot (93,000 m^{2}) manufacturing and headquarters facility for Stewart-Warner until the company left Chicago in 1988.

Due to his patents, Stewart collected $311,000 in royalties, which were calculated at $5 per speedometer sold in 1909.

Unfortunately, Clark was killed while demonstrating the Stewart speedometer in a Packard during the 1907 Glidden Tour #. Stewart acquired Clarks' share of the company.

=== J.K. Stewart Manufacturing Company ===
Due to the need for the blades of clippers & shears to last longer and remain sharp, Stewart worked with Edward Larson to build a heat treatment furnace for tempering steel. In 1906 the two formed the E.A. Larson & Brothers Company to take advantage of the processes they developed to provide die casting for speedometer production as well as other companies in the area. In 1908, E.A. Larson was reorganized as the J.K. Stewart Manufacturing Company.

=== Stewart-Warner Speedometer Corporation ===
Stewart and rival instrument manufacturer, Warner Instrument Company, were in heated legal battles over patent infringements by both parties. All lawsuits ceased when Stewart bought the Warner Instrument Company in 1912. Stewart-Warner Speedometer Corporation was formed the same year by consolidating the Warner Company with the Stewart & Clark Manufacturing Company. Once again the name changed in 1929 to Stewart-Warner Corporation.

=== Stewart Phonograph Company ===
A lover of music, Stewart ventured into the phonograph market in 1915. Eventually becoming a division of Stewart-Warner, the phonograph company expanded to include radios, televisions, and the required accessories such as speakers.

== Miscellaneous ==
- John K Stewart dictated, onto 18 business phonograph cylinders, instructions for the construction of a 225-foot (69 m) oceangoing personal yacht. This yacht was built and named The Sialia.
- Wm. Cooper & Nephews declined the opportunity to purchase a portion of Stewarts' speedometer company, believing the product was too speculative. - Starting in 1908 Stewart Speedometers were installed in Fords Model-Ts.
- In 1916, Leander H. La Chance, Mrs. Stewart's half-nephew, was president of Chicago Flexible Shaft and in 1910 the company produces its first household appliance the Princess Electric Iron under the brand name of Sunbeam, a brand that still provides appliances today.
