= Flexible shaft =

Cable for transmitting rotation in any direction

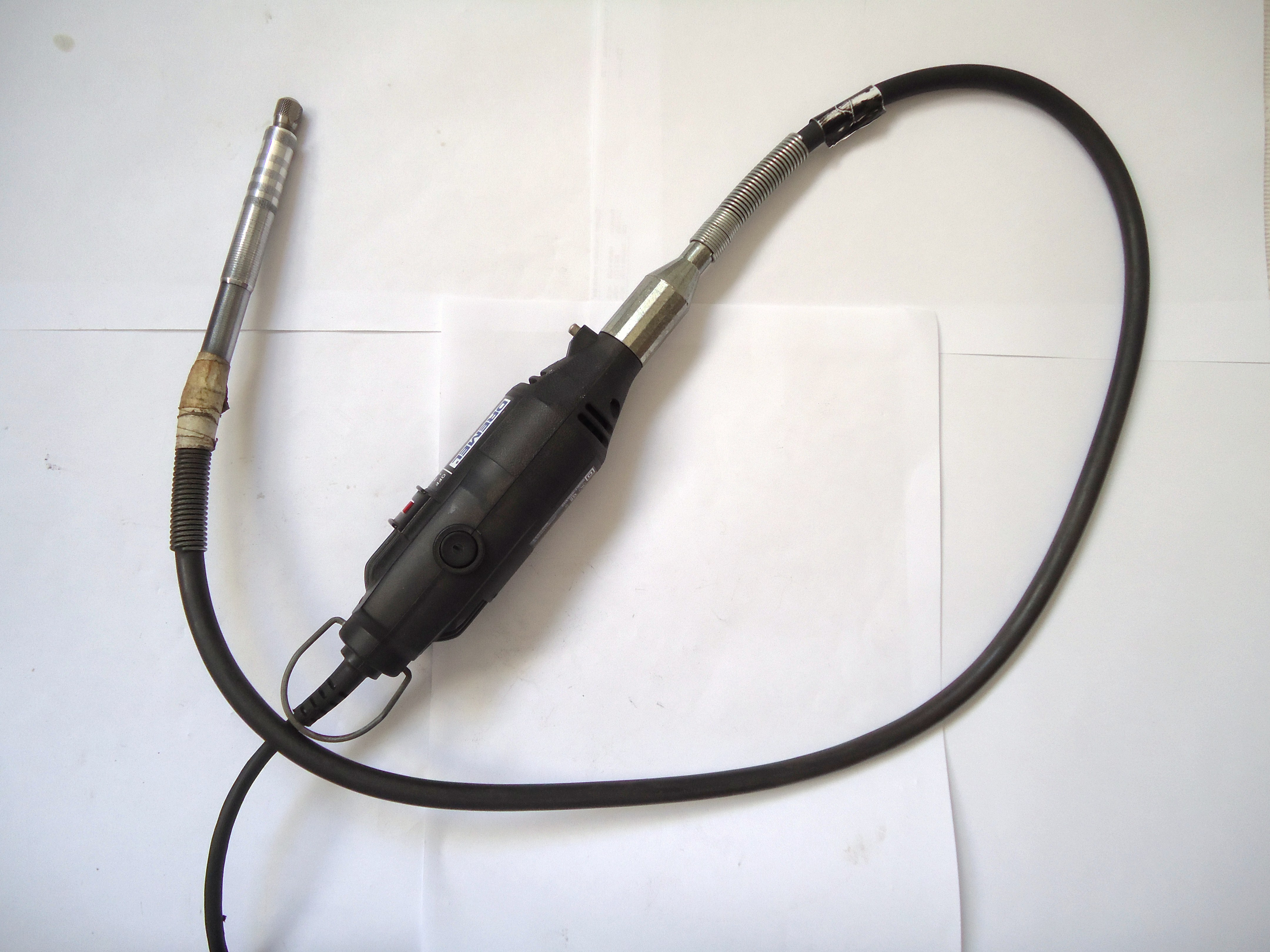
Flexible shaft tool

A flexible shaft, often referred to as a flex shaft, is a device for transmitting rotary motion between two objects which are not fixed relative to one another. It consists of a rotating wire rope or coil which is flexible but has some torsional stiffness. It may or may not have a covering, which also bends but does not rotate. It may transmit considerable power, or only motion, with negligible power.

Flexible shafts are commonly used in plumber's snakes. They are popular accessories for handheld rotary tools, and integral parts of rotary tools with a remote motor, which are called "flexible shaft tools". They are used to transmit power to some sheep shears. They are also sold to connect panel knobs to remote potentiometers or other variable electronic components. Flexible shaft tools are used frequently in the dental and jewelry industry, as well as other industrial applications.

== See also ==
- Driveshaft
- John K. Stewart
- Bowden cable
