= Bowden cable =

Flexible cable used to transmit force

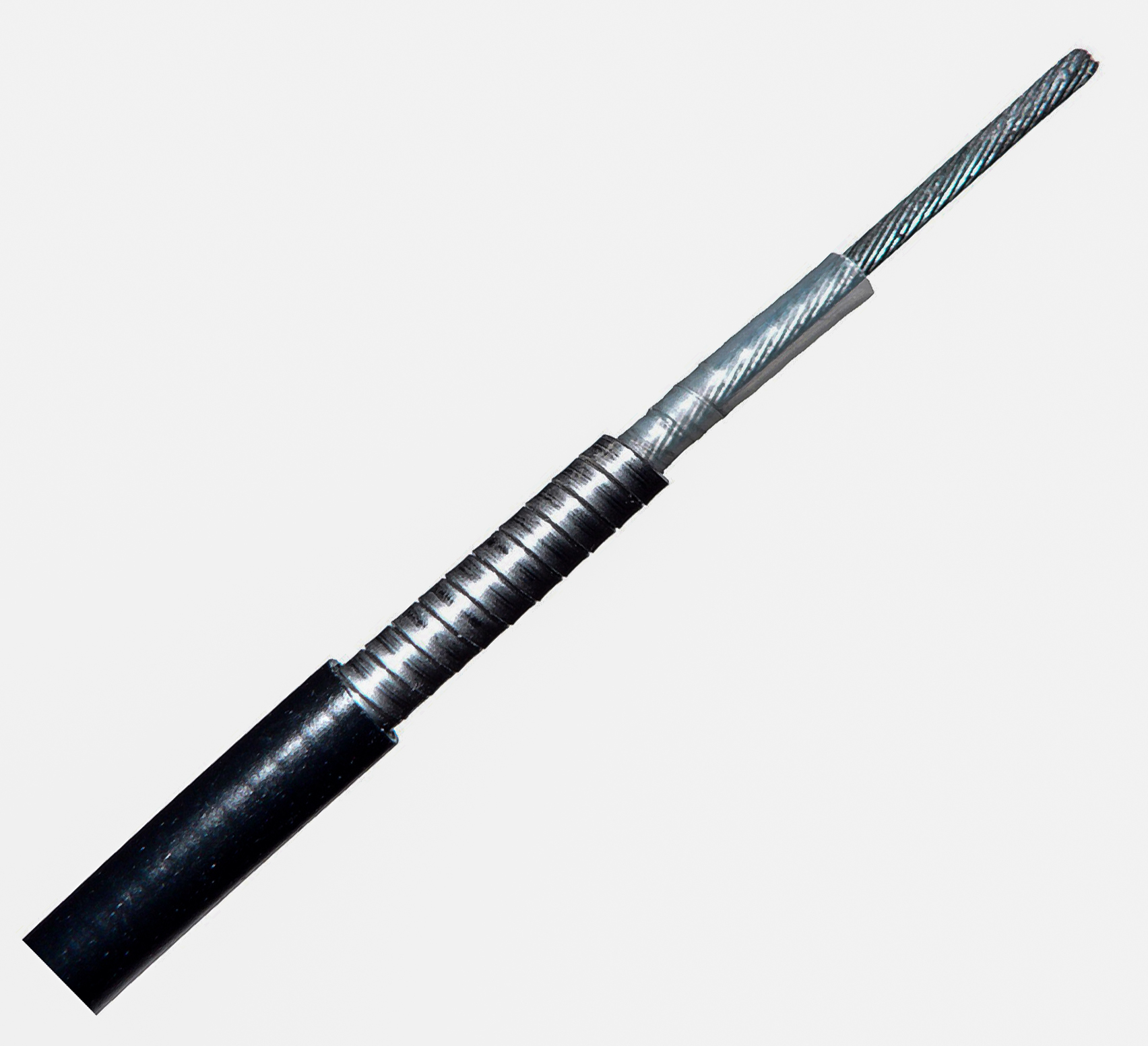
Cut-away Bowden cable view. From left to right: protective plastic coating, steel structure, inner sleeve to reduce friction, inner cable

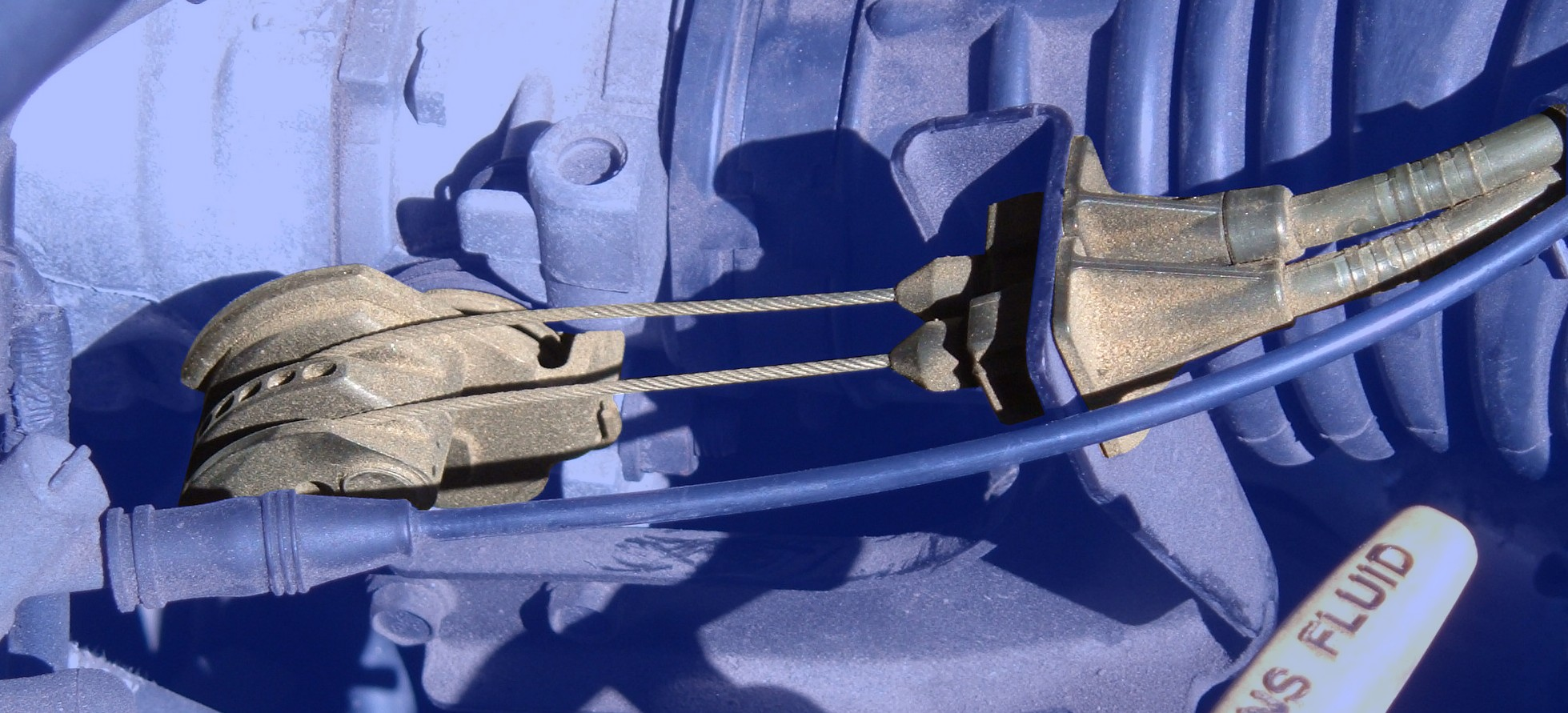
Bowden cables controlling an automobile throttle

A Bowden cable (/ˈboʊdən/ BOH-dən) is a type of flexible cable used to transmit mechanical force or energy by the movement of an inner cable relative to a hollow outer cable housing. The housing is generally of composite construction, consisting of an inner lining, a longitudinally incompressible layer such as a helical winding or a sheath of steel wire, and a protective outer covering.

The linear movement of the inner cable may be used to transmit pull force, or both push and pull forces. Many light aircraft use a push/pull Bowden cable for the throttle control, and here it is normal for the inner element to be a solid wire, rather than a multi-strand cable. Usually, provision is made for adjusting the cable tension using an inline hollow bolt (often called a barrel adjuster), which lengthens or shortens the cable housing relative to a fixed anchor point. Lengthening the housing (turning the barrel adjuster out) tightens the cable; shortening the housing (turning the barrel adjuster in) loosens the cable.

== History ==
The origin and invention of the Bowden cable are open to some dispute and confusion. The invention of the Bowden cable has been popularly attributed to Sir Frank Bowden, one-time owner of the Raleigh Bicycle Company, who, circa 1902, was reputed to have started replacing the rigid rods used for brakes with a flexible wound cable, but no evidence for such has been found.

The Bowden mechanism was invented by Irishman Ernest Monnington Bowden (1860 to April 3, 1904) of 35 Bedford Place, London, W.C. The first patent was granted in 1896 (English Patent 25,325 and U.S. Pat. No. 609,570), and the invention was reported in the Automotor Journal of 1897, where Bowden's address was given as 9 Fopstone Rd, Earls Court. The two Bowdens are not known to be closely related. The principal element of this was a flexible tube (made from hard wound wire and fixed at each end) containing a length of fine wire rope that could slide within the tube, directly transmitting pulling, pushing or turning movements on the wire rope from one end to the other without the need of pulleys or flexible joints. The cable was particularly intended for use in conjunction with bicycle brakes. The Bowden Brake was launched amidst a flurry of enthusiasm in the cycle press in 1896. It consisted of a stirrup, pulled up by the cable from a handlebar mounted lever, and rubber pads acting against the rear wheel rim. At this date bicycles were fixed-wheel (no freewheel), additional braking being offered by a 'plunger' brake pressing on the front tyre. The Bowden offered extra braking power still and was novel enough to appeal to riders who scorned the plunger arrangement, which was heavy and potentially damaging to the (expensive) pneumatic tyre. The problems for Bowden were his failure to develop effective distribution networks and that the brake was often incorrectly, or inappropriately, fitted, resulting in a good number of complaints being aired in the press. Its most effective application was on those machines fitted with Westwood pattern steel rims, which offered flat contact surfaces for the brake pads.

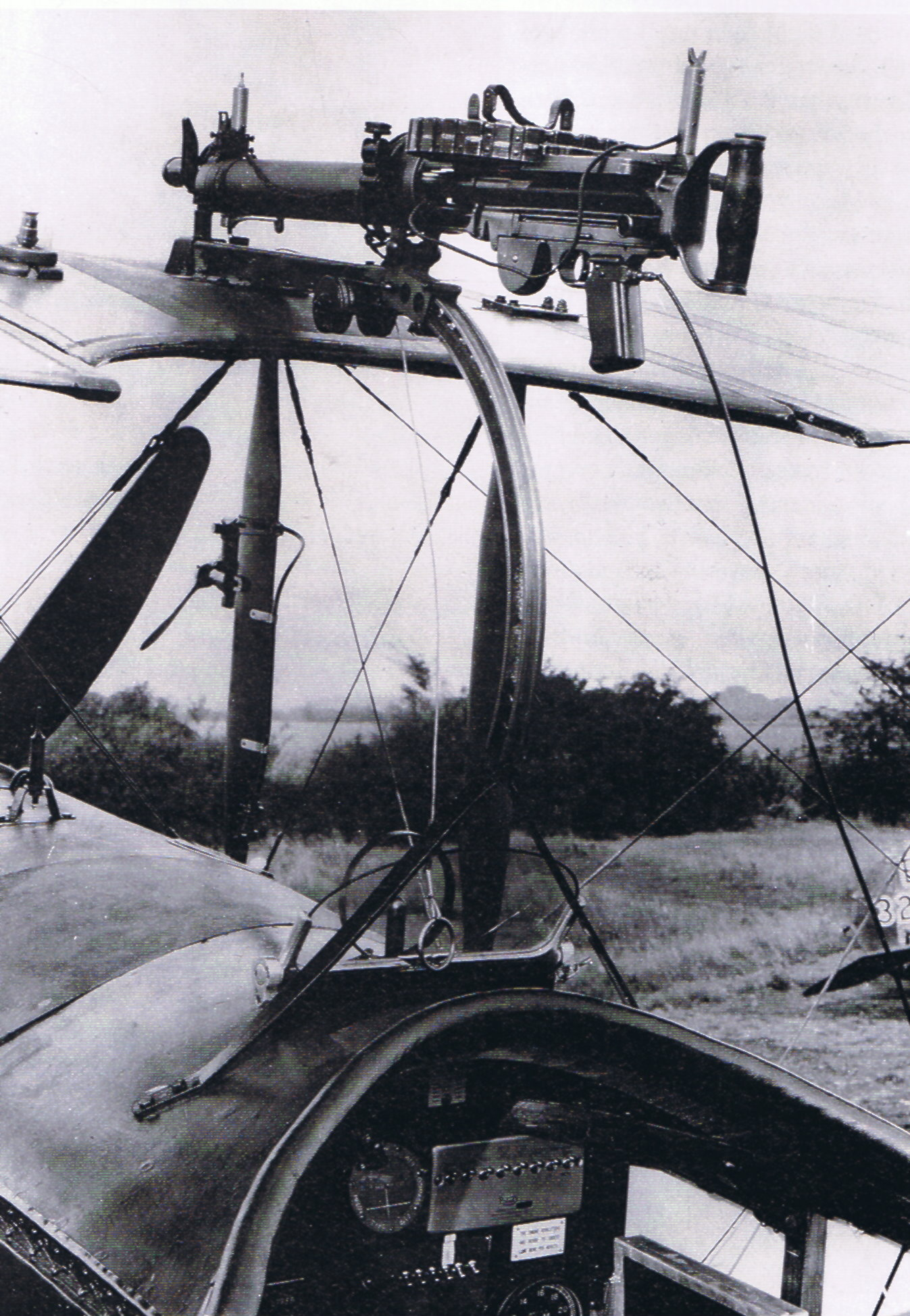
A 1918 Lewis gun on a Foster mounting fitted to an Avro 504K Night Fighter. The gun trigger is operated by a Bowden cable.

The potential of the Bowden cable and associated brake was not to be fully realised until the freewheel sprocket became a standard feature of bicycles, over the period 1899–1901, and increasing numbers of applications were found for it, such as gear change mechanisms. Importantly in 1903, Hendee developed the twist-grip throttle using a similar cable for his 'Indian' motorcycles. Its lightness and flexibility recommended it to further automotive use such as clutch and speedometer drive cables.

It is reported that "on 12th January 1900 E. M. Bowden granted a licence to The Raleigh Cycle Company of Nottingham", whose directors were Frank Bowden and Edward Harlow. At this signing they became members of 'E. M. Bowden's Patent Syndicate Limited'. The syndicate included, among others, R. H. Lea & Graham I. Francis of Lea & Francis Ltd, and William Riley of the Riley Cycle Company. The Raleigh company were soon offering the Bowden Brake as an accessory, and were quick to incorporate the cable into handlebar mounted Sturmey-Archer (in which they had a major interest) gear changes. Undoubtedly this is why E. Bowden and F. Bowden are sometimes confused today.

Early Bowden cable, from the 1890s and first years of the twentieth century, is characterised by the outer tube being wound from round wire and being uncovered. At the ends they are usually fitted with a brass collar marked 'BOWDEN PATENT', (this legend is also stamped into other components of the original brake). More modern versions have their outer tube wound from square section wire. From c. 1902 the cable was usually covered in a waterproofed fabric sheath; in the early post-war period this was replaced by plastic.

=== Possible contribution by Larkin ===
An unpublished typescript exists in the archives of the National Motor Museum, written by the son of one of Bowden's employees, that attempts to claim the invention of the cable for his father to the point of suggesting that it was never applied to bicycles before 1902. Although this is easily disproved by reference to 'Cycling' or the other UK cycle press through 1896–97, it serves to remind one of the attempts made to rewrite cycle history through priority claims. In this narrative a flexible cable brake for cycles was separately 'invented' by George Frederick Larkin, a skilled automobile and motorcycle engineer, who patented his design in 1902. He was subsequently recruited by, and worked for, E.M. Bowden until 1917 as General Works Manager.

"George Larkin is known for his invention of the flexible cable brake for cycles, which was patented in 1902. The original patent for a similar invention known as the 'Bowden mechanism' was granted to Ernest Monnington Bowden in 1896. The following year E.M. Bowden's Patents Syndicate Ltd. was formed to market the device but initially the project was a failure because all the company could offer was a flimsy mechanism capable of transmitting comparatively enormous power. The Bowden Mechanism was not developed in connection with a cycle brake as there is no record of the cable having been associated with the cycle industry until 1902, when George Larkin's invention was patented."

"During Larkin's employment with Bassett Motor Syndicate his duties included the assembly of motor cars and motor cycles, and a major difficulty was the assembly of the braking systems, which at that time comprised steel rods, not easily adaptable to chassis contours. He designed a flexible cable brake and approached S.J. Withers, Patent Agent, to have the design patented. Withers noticed the similarity of Larkin's idea to the Bowden Mechanism and introduced him to the Bowden Syndicate, who agreed to manufacture and market the invention with the proviso that it should be patented jointly in the names of the inventor and themselves. Within a few months, Larkin, then aged 23, was engaged as Motor Department Manager with E.M. Bowden's Patents Syndicate, and he was appointed General Works Manager on 1 May 1904."

== Parts and variations ==
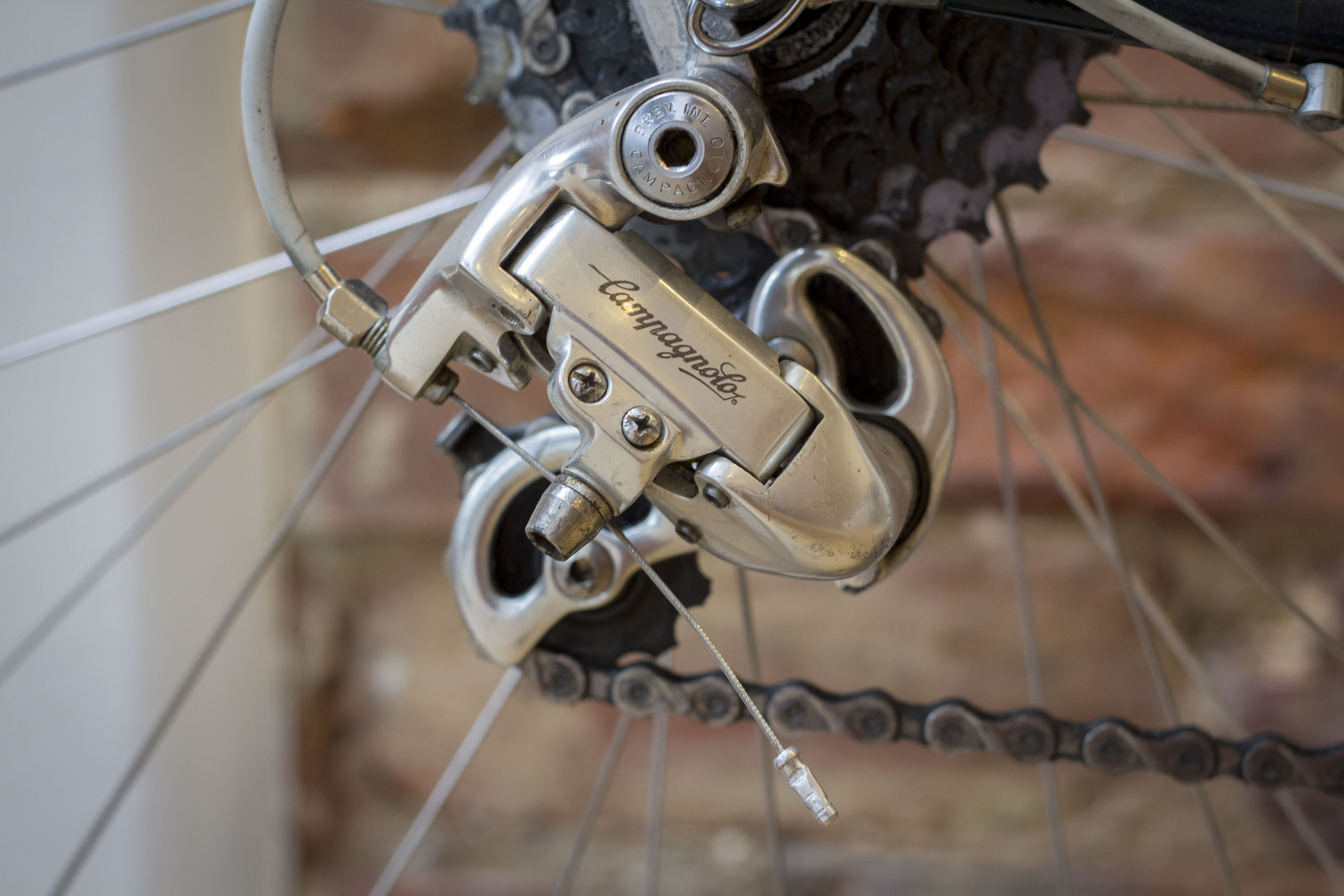
Bowden cable with a barrel adjuster controlling a bicycle rear derailleur

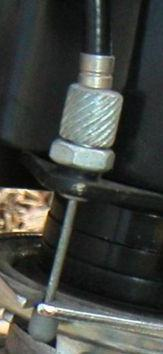
Bowden cable with a barrel adjuster and locking nut in a BMX rear brake detangler

=== Housing ===
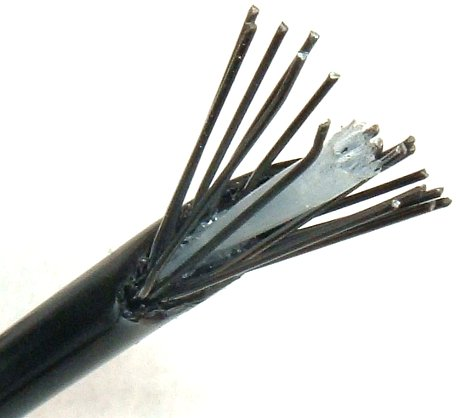
Constant-length housing for indexed shifting

The original, standard Bowden cable housing consists of a close-wound helix of round or square steel wire. This makes a flexible housing but causes the length to change as the housing flexes. Because on the inside of the bend the turns of a close-wound helix can't get any closer together, the bending causes the turns to separate on the outside of the bend, and so at the centerline of the housing, there must also be an increase of length with increasing bend.

In order to support indexed shifting, Shimano developed a type of housing that does not change length as it is flexed. This housing has several wire strands running in a multiple helix, with a pitch short enough such that bends in the cable are shared by all strands, but long enough so that the housing's flexibility comes by bending the individual strands rather than by twisting them. A consequence of a long winding pitch in a support helix is that it approaches the case of parallel strands where the wires are bound only by the plastic jacket. Housings with a long helix cannot withstand the high compression that is associated with high cable tensions, and on overload tend to fail by the buckling of the housing strands. For this reason, helical support for brake cables is close wound, while housings with a longer helix are used for less critical applications. Longitudinally arranged support wires are used in applications such as bicycle gear-shifting.

A third type of housing consists of short hollow rigid aluminum or carbon fiber cylinders slid over a flexible liner. Claimed benefits over steel wire housing include less weight, tighter curves, and less compression under load.

=== Inner wire ===
The inner wire rope for push applications has an additional winding that runs in the opposite direction to the wind of the innermost wire. The wind may be like that of a spring or a wind with a flat strip; these are respectively called spring wrap and spiral wrap.

Some applications, such as lawn mower throttles, automobile manual chokes, and some bicycle shifting systems require significant pushing ability and so use a cable with a solid inner wire. These cables are usually less flexible than ones with stranded inner wires.

=== Ends ===
One end of the inner cable may have a small shaped piece of metal, known (from the pear-shaped soldered terminations used in some cases) as a nipple (as can be seen in the BMX rear brake detangler picture) that fits into a shifter or brake lever mechanism. The other end is often clamped (as can be seen in the rear derailleur picture) to the part of the brake or shifter that needs to be moved or, as is most common with motorcycle control cables, fitted with another nipple.

Traditionally, in bicycles a shifter cable is anchored on the shifter end with a small cylindrical nipple, concentric with the cable. Bicycle brake nipples however, vary between mountain bikes (MTB), with straight handlebars, and road bikes, with drop-handlebars. A mountain bike typically uses a barrel-shaped (cylindrical) nipple to anchor a brake cable at the brake lever, while a road bike typically uses a pear-shaped nipple. Some replacement brake cables for bicycles come with both styles, one on each end. The unneeded end is cut off and discarded upon installation.

In bicycle applications, for both brakes and gear-shifting, the outer dimension of the cap, or ferrule, that terminates a housing is selected to make a loose fit within the barrel-adjuster's end. In this way the barrel will slip on the ferrule as it is turned during adjustments. If the ferrule were to be jammed into the barrel end, then the cable would twist during fruitless attempts at adjustment.

Nipples are also available separately from the cable, for purposes of repair or custom cable construction. They are fitted to the cable by soldering. Where free rotation of nipples around the cable axis is required the cable end may be finished with a brass ferrule, or trumpet, soldered to the cable. The barrel nipple fit loosely over the brass ferrule, and can thus rotate, avoiding twisting of the inner cable. Applying heat to the inner cable for soldering may weaken the steel, and, although soft solder is weaker than silver solder, the temperature required to form the joint is lower so the inner cable is less likely to be damaged. Silver soldering may require additional heat treatment of the wire to preserve the temper of it in order to prevent it from becoming too soft or too brittle.

Nipples that clamp to the cable by means of screws also are available for emergency repair purposes, or where removal is required for maintenance.

A small ferrule, also called a crimp (seen in the rear derailleur picture), may be crimped on to prevent cable ends from fraying.

Other methods to prevent fraying include soft- or silver-soldering cable ends and, ideally, flash cutting cables.

If the inner wire is solid, as in automotive and lawnmower throttle and choke applications, it may simply have a bend at one or both ends to engage what ever it pushes or pulls.

=== Donuts ===
Small rubber tori, called donuts, can be threaded onto a bare run of the inner cable to prevent it from striking the bicycle frame causing rattles or abrasion.

=== Common practice ===
The indexed shifting of a bicycle derailleur needs to be exact. A typical 7-speed shifter changes the cable length by either 2.9 mm (Shimano 2:1) or 4.5 mm (SRAM 1:1) for each shift, and any length errors accumulate with the number of shifts. To this end, the housing needs to behave as if it were a solid tube, so it, and its end-pieces have to be compressionless. Currently, the most commonly used compressionless housing for gear shifting has longitudinally spaced steel wires. The flat-cut ends of such housing are tight-terminated with end caps or ferrules, and the ends caps are sized to fit either into a fixture on the frame, or as a loose fitting in the end of a barrel adjuster.

Housings for bicycle brakes need not be quite so compressionless, but need to be stronger, and items currently sold for this purpose use a close-wound spiral support wire. One end of a brake housing is tight-terminated in an end cap or ferrule that makes a loose fit within a barrel adjuster, and the other in any of a variety of fittings that includes end caps, or parts to effect a smooth change of direction. In any case, at the point where the cable emerges for attachment to the brake arms, is fitted a nipple. In view of the wide array of cable constructions on offer, confusion as to the best housing can easily result. In general, a housing sold for one purpose should not be used for any other, and in any case the advice of the manufacturer should be followed. In particular, longitudinally reinforced housings should not be used for bicycle brakes, since they are weaker than the spirally wound housings.

Housings for bicycles are made in two main diameters; most often 4 mm diameter is used for gear-shifting and 5 mm for brakes. Both shifting and brake housings are manufactured in both sizes. However, some care is needed in changing cables, since, for example, the 4 mm barrel adjuster end of an existing shifter is probably made only for that housing size.

Although the individual parts for cable assembly can be acquired, ready-made cables for both brakes and shifting are available. These usually consist of an inner wire within a length of housing, and depending on their purpose, with one or more end caps fitted. However, because of the wide range of fittings in use, it is probable that these universal cables' caps, although suiting many situations, will not suit every purpose, as their name wrongly implies. The shortening of housings requires the use of a special hand tool, designed to make a square cut without closing the cable entry. The same tool is used to cut the internal steel cable. To avoid unraveling of the cable's wires during installation, manufacturers weld or crimp the ends.

Housings for cables have habitually been made only in black, though some colored housings can also be found.

== Maintenance ==
Bowden cables can cease to function smoothly, particularly if water or contaminants get into the housing. Modern lined and stainless steel cables are less prone to these problems; unlined housings should be lubricated with a light machine oil. In cold climates Bowden cable mechanisms are prone to malfunction due to water freezing. Cables also wear through use over a long time, and can be damaged through kinking or raveling. A common failure occurs on bicycles at the point where the housing enters a barrel adjuster; loose housing ends tend to fray the housing, making adjustments uncertain. Fraying due to fatigue is most likely if the cable passes over a pulley, which on bicycles is often below the recommended diameter, or where the cable is bent repeatedly where it attaches to the brake lever or caliper. A cable passing around a sharp bend tend to furrow the inner cable sleeve, leading to contact with the outer housing and rub fraying. A frayed cable can suddenly break when force is applied strongly, e.g. during emergency braking, or it can get stuck in the outer cable, leading to sudden unintended acceleration if it is a throttle control cable.

The specifications for cables and housings rarely give any details other than dimensions and the purpose of the products. The specific resistance to compression or bending is never quoted, so there is much rhetorical evidence and comment as to the performance and durability of products, but little available science for the consumer's use. A particularly severe quality test for housings is at or near the hinge of a folding bicycle where a sharp bend is made repeatedly. The radius of curvature of cables on a folded bicycle can be as low as 1.5 inches, (4 cm); therefore it is advisable to shift to the gear with the lowest cable pressure before folding, to minimize any adverse effects on housings or derailleurs. This gear is usually the one with the highest index number on the gear shifter.

There is some controversy surrounding the existence of the phenomenon known as "cable stretch". Newly installed cables can seem to elongate, requiring readjustment. While it is generally agreed that inner wires actually stretch very little - if at all - housings and linings may compress slightly, and all parts may generally "settle in". Lightweight assemblies such as those used on bicycles are more susceptible to this phenomenon.

== Uses ==
- Sustain pedal linkage on Wurlitzer electric pianos
- Bicycle brakes and gear shift cables
- Photographic shutter release cables
- Automotive clutch, throttle/cruise control, emergency brake, and various latch release cables
- Aircraft engine controls including throttle or power control, propeller pitch or RPM, fuel mixture, carburetor heat, and cowl flaps
- Motorcycle throttle, clutch and (now rarely) brake cables
- Control surfaces on small aircraft
- Remote hi-hats in drum kits
- Operate terminal device hook on prosthetic arms
- Lawn mower throttle and dead man's switch
- Interlocking in electrical switchgear
- Trigger activation for remotely located machine guns on French 1930s era Char B1 bis tanks, and for the DISA tripod used with the Madsen machine gun.
- Many 3D printers of the type that extrude plastic filament use a "Bowden extruder" to feed the filament through a tube, typically PTFE ('Teflon') to minimize friction, to the 'hot-end' where it is melted and deposited through a nozzle. This has the advantage of shifting the mass of the extruder's mechanism and stepper motor from the moving hot-end to a fixed mount on the printer's frame, allowing greater printing speed and accuracy.
- Flexible drive shafts for 'Dremel'-type rotary multi-tools, die grinder attachments for bench grinders, and the like
- Bowden cables are sometimes used in flush toilets to connect the flush to the flapper.
