= Roto North America =

Hardware company

- Industry: Window and Door Hardware Manufacturing
- Founded: 1979; 47 years ago
- Headquarters: Chester, Connecticut, and Mississauga, Ontario, US, and Canada
- Key people: Chris Dimou (President and CEO), Patrick Kampermann (Director of Finance), Dan Gray (Director of Sales), Adrian Steenson (Director of Operations), Juergen Schairer (Director of Product Innovation and Sales Engineering)
- Website: www.rotonorthamerica.com

Roto North America is a window/door hardware manufacturing and distribution company that comprises Roto Frank of America, Inc., based in Chester, Connecticut, US, and Roto Fasco Canada Inc., based in Mississauga, Ontario, Canada.

Roto Frank of America and Roto Fasco Canada are wholly owned subsidiaries of Roto AG, headquartered in Germany.

Through Roto Frank of America and Roto Fasco Canada, Roto North America manufactures and offers a variety of North American and European window and door hardware products.

== History ==
Roto Frank of America, Inc. was founded in Chester, Connecticut, in 1979 as a wholly owned subsidiary of the Germany-based Roto Frank AG, which had 18 production plants and more than 40 subsidiaries globally.

Roto Frank of America began manufacturing roof windows and distributing Tilt&Turn hardware. Later on, the company realized the great potential that existed in the window and door hardware market, expanding its products towards the North American market. This led to the establishment of Roto Hardware Systems, which started developing its own line of North American-specific products, including X-Drive casement window operators, window locking systems, window hinges and sash locks. Roto Frank of America, Inc. has been an integral part of Connecticut's manufacturing industry for 40 years.

Chris Dimou has served as President & CEO of Roto Frank of America since 2009 and President & CEO of Roto Fasco Canada since it was acquired by the Roto Group in 2012. Dimou represents Roto Frank of America on the Middlesex County Chamber of Commerce Board of Directors.

Roto Fasco Canada, Inc. was established in 1956 as Fasco Diecast Metals in Mississauga, Ontario. The company was acquired in 2012 by Roto AG and operated by Roto North America. It is now a producer of sliding patio door and cam lock hardware for residential and commercial window and door markets throughout North America.

The Roto Group now has a presence in over 40 countries with over 4900 employees. In January 2016, the Roto AG Group continued its expansion of its global window and door technology market with the acquisition of the Deventer Group, a global building materials supplier. It also acquired the industrial division of the Danish hardware manufacturer Peder Nielsen, a supplier of hardware for outward-opening windows of the type mainly found in Scandinavia and also in Great Britain.

In June 2017, the Roto Group acquired Union Ltd., a manufacturer based near Shanghai, China to help strengthen and expand its door and window technology division.

On November 1, 2017, Roto Frank AG acquired Wollenberg GmbH, a company that offers services for subsequently improving windows and doors.

== See also ==
- Lockset
- Door handle
- Builders hardware
- Window shutter hardware
