= Stewart-Warner =

American manufacturer

- Founded: 1905; 121 years ago
- Founder: John K. Stewart
- Headquarters: Chicago, Illinois, United States

Stewart-Warner, also known as Stewart-Warner Corporation, was an American manufacturer of vehicle instruments (e.g., gauges and lubricating equipment) and many other products.

== History ==
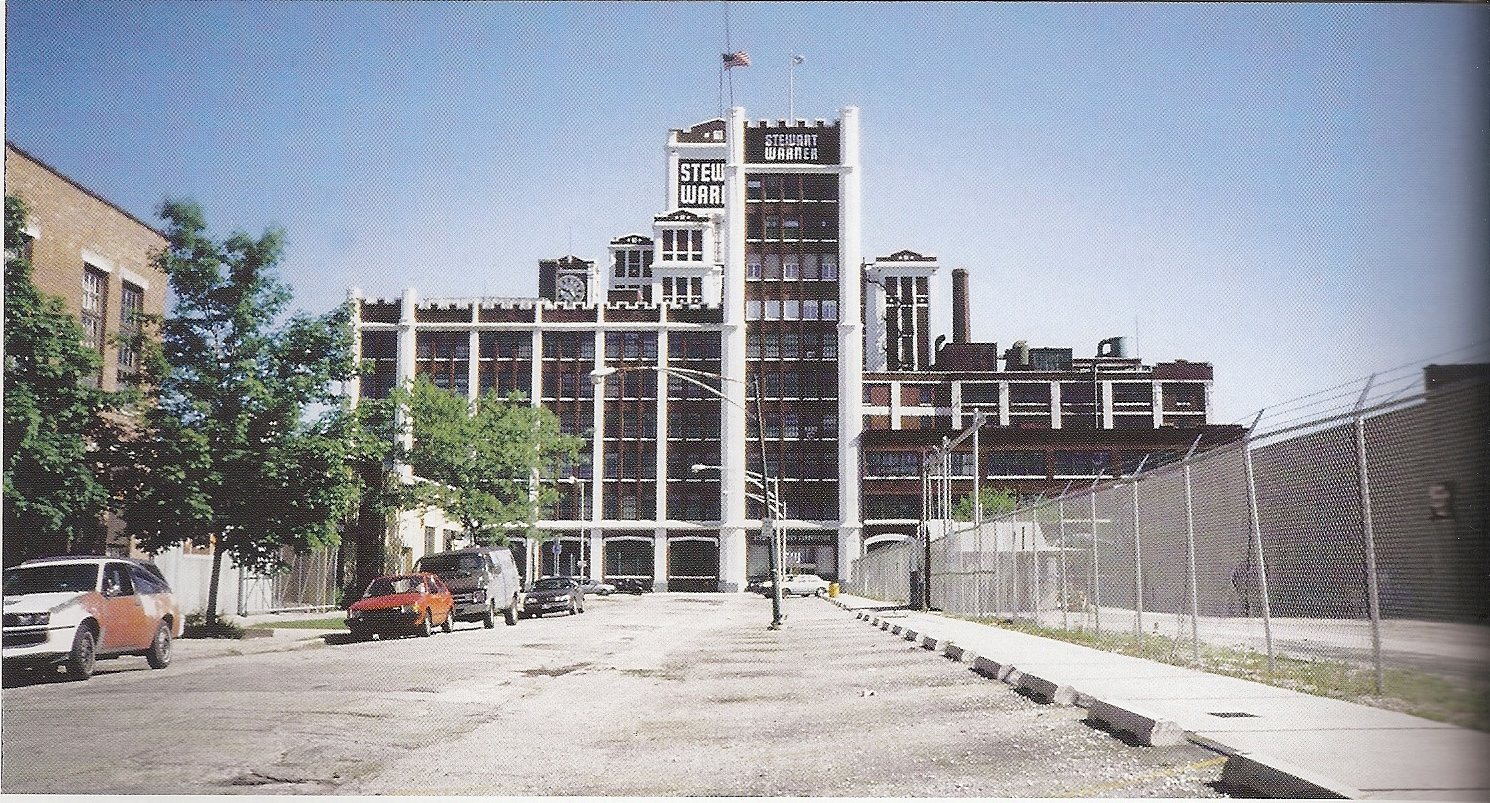
Vacant Stewart-Warner headquarters building in Chicago 1990

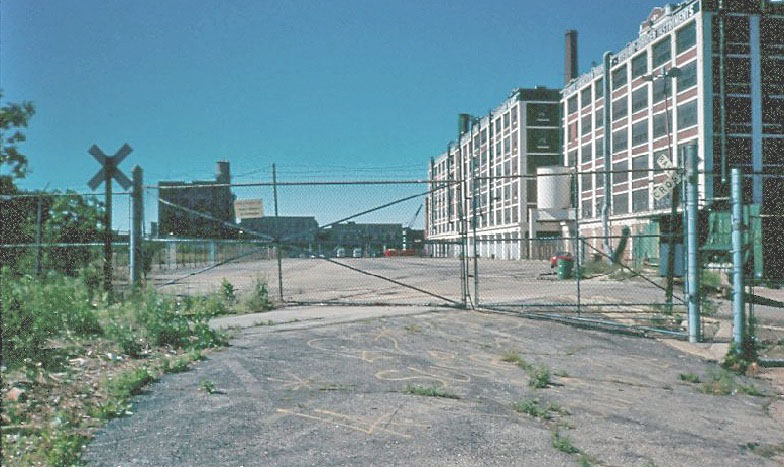
View of the back of the Stewart-Warner plant, looking south. To the left or east is the Chicago & North Western's Deering Yard. The track in the foreground going through the gate served Stewart-Warner. Today this area is all condos with a new street grid. 1990.

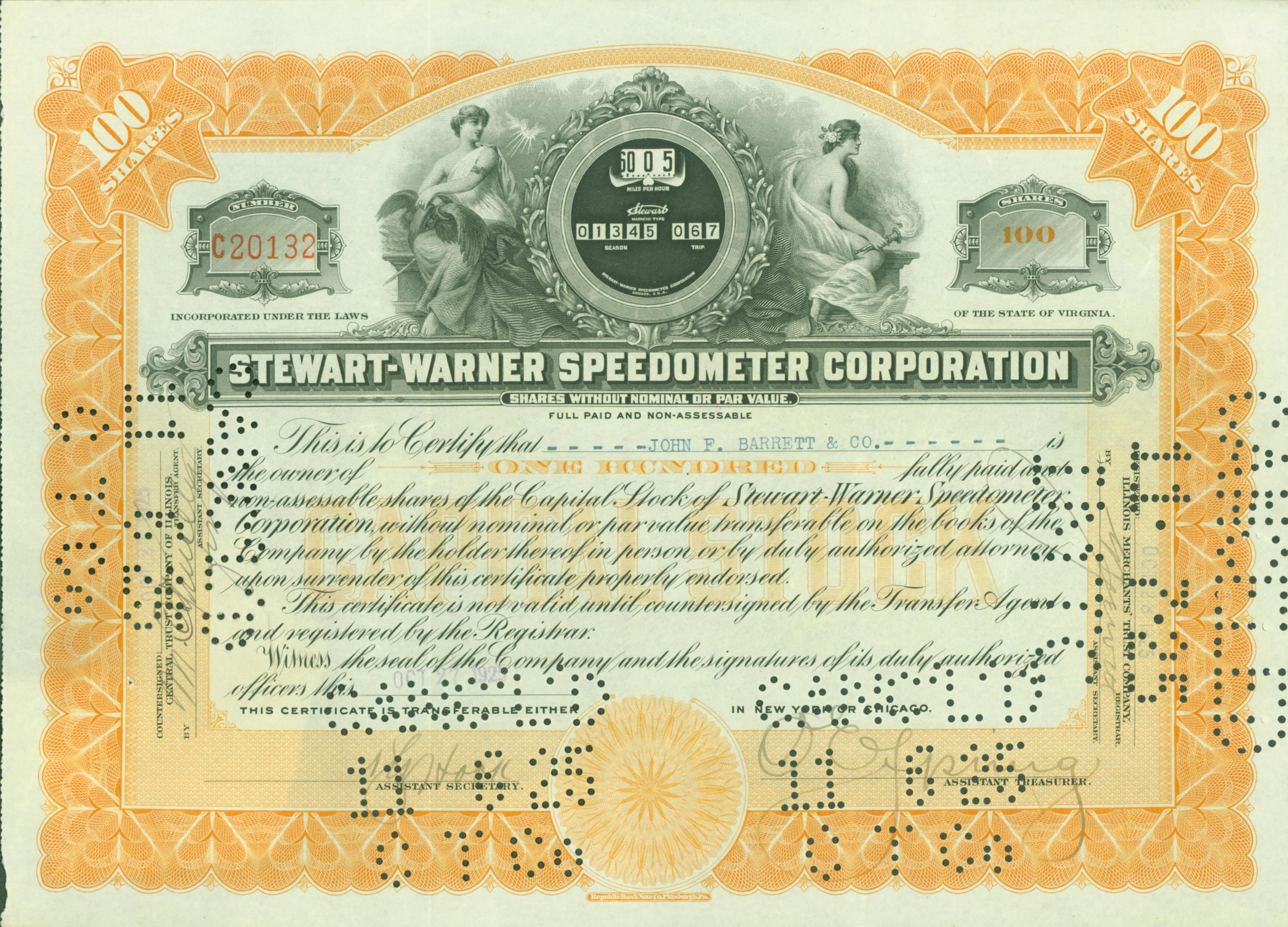
Share of the Stewart-Warner Speedometer Corp., issued 22. October 1925l

The company was founded as Stewart & Clark Company in 1905 by John K. Stewart. Their speedometers were used in the Ford Model T. In 1912 John Stewart joined with Edgar Bassick to make vehicle instruments and horns. Bassick owned Alemite Co. and Stewart had bought the Warner Instrument Company; thus the name was changed to the Stewart-Warner Corporation. The company started in Chicago and built a manufacturing plant on Diversey Parkway. The building kept expanding and finally covered one million square feet (93,000 m²) and six floors. At its peak S-W employed 6000 people at the Diversey complex. They also made radios and refrigerators, among other products, and produced the ubiquitous "zerk" grease fitting, named after its inventor, associated with the company. In the last years of the company's Chicago factory, it owned a number of aging six-spindle Brown & Sharpe and New Britain screw machines.

Stewart-Warner had other locations, including at 2600 North Pulaski in Chicago, and in later years a distribution center in Elgin, Illinois, located just south of I-90 and east of Rt. 25. The company also opened a plant in Harlow, Essex, England in the late 1950s, which became its European headquarters. Stan Hagerman initially was Director of the UK plant, followed by Curtis W. Van Allen in 1960, who later became vice president and general manager of international operations in Chicago.

The Diversey Parkway complex was the site of both S-W's international headquarters and the Instrument & Alemite manufacturing operations. "Alemite" referred to S-W's line of lubricating stations, and "Instruments" referred to speedometers and similar gauges. The front that faced Diversey was the location of corporate offices, while to the rear was manufacturing with a warehouse south of Diversey. A large employee cafeteria was inside the main building, which also included an underground garage for executives (including CEO Bennett Archambault, who arrived each morning by limousine) with an entrance off Wolcott just north of Diversey. Corporate archives were housed in the basement below the main tower, and executive offices were in the top floors of the tower. Stewart-Warner operated a free shuttle van service for employees who commuted by train to and from the Clybourn Metra (C&NW) station. In 1981 S-W experienced a labor strike at the Chicago operations. The Elgin site was eventually taken over by Middleby Corporation.

The main Chicago plant and headquarters of Stewart-Warner along Diversey Parkway in Chicago were located in the Deering Industrial Area in Chicago's Lincoln Park neighborhood. As such, S-W was served by both the Chicago and North Western Railroad on the north side, and by both the Milwaukee Road and C&NW on the south end at the warehouse north of Clybourn and east of Wolcott. In later years S-W was served by only the C&NW off tracks along the east side of the S-W plant and parallel to the C&NW North Line.

The company also made heat exchangers starting in the 1940s under the South Wind Division, but after then, it became independent of its parent. Stewart-Warner ranked 95th among United States corporations in the value of World War II military production contracts.

Stewart-Warner was also a manufacturer and distributor of scoreboards, beginning in 1966. Scoreboards created and installed by Stewart-Warner during the 1960s and 1970s included those at Nassau Veterans Memorial Coliseum in Uniondale, New York; Atlanta–Fulton County Stadium; Fenway Park in Boston, Tiger Stadium in Detroit; Exhibition Stadium in Toronto; Los Angeles Memorial Coliseum, Anaheim Stadium, Arrowhead Stadium and Royals Stadium in Kansas City; Aloha Stadium in Honolulu; Giants Stadium in East Rutherford, New Jersey; McNichols Sports Arena and Mile High Stadium in Denver; Milwaukee County Stadium in Wisconsin; Three Rivers Stadium in Pittsburgh; Veterans Stadium and the Spectrum in Philadelphia; Busch Stadium in St. Louis; and the Capital Centre in Landover, Maryland. The latter featured the first videoscreen in a stadium or arena, the Telscreen.

In 1963, Stewart-Warner established an integrated circuit fabrication facility, Stewart-Warner Microcircuits, in Sunnyvale, California.

In the mid-1980s, Stewart-Warner's scoreboard division was sold off to another Chicago company, White Way Sign, which took over the maintenance, upgrading and replacement of most of these aforementioned scoreboards.

The last CEO of Stewart-Warner was Bennett Archambault, who died in 1996. He was appointed president and CEO in 1954.

On September 9, 1987, British Tire & Rubber BTR plc entered into an agreement to purchase Stewart-Warner. In 1989, new owner BTR decided to relocate operations to Juarez, Mexico, and shut down the Chicago plant and offices, which at the time still employed 700 workers. BTR eventually spun off its Stewart-Warner instruments business to a company named Stewart-Warner Instruments Corporation three executives of Stewart Warner, Mike Benner CEO, Tom Walsh CFO and Joe Plomin VP Sales and Marketing purchased the company from BTR. In early 1998 Stewart-Warner Instruments Corporation was bought by Datcon Instrument Company of Lancaster, Pennsylvania (later renamed to Maxima Technologies). Maxima Technologies was then acquired by Actuant Inc., now called Enerpac Tool Group, a diversified multi-national industrial corporation in 2006, and renamed Maximatecc. Currently Stewart-Warner is headquartered in Lancaster, and is a part of Enerpac's Engineered Solutions Business Segment.

On April 25, 1993, a fire destroyed most of the empty Stewart-Warner Chicago headquarters and factory buildings. What was left was demolished and replaced by condominiums.

== Examples of Stewart-Warner products ==
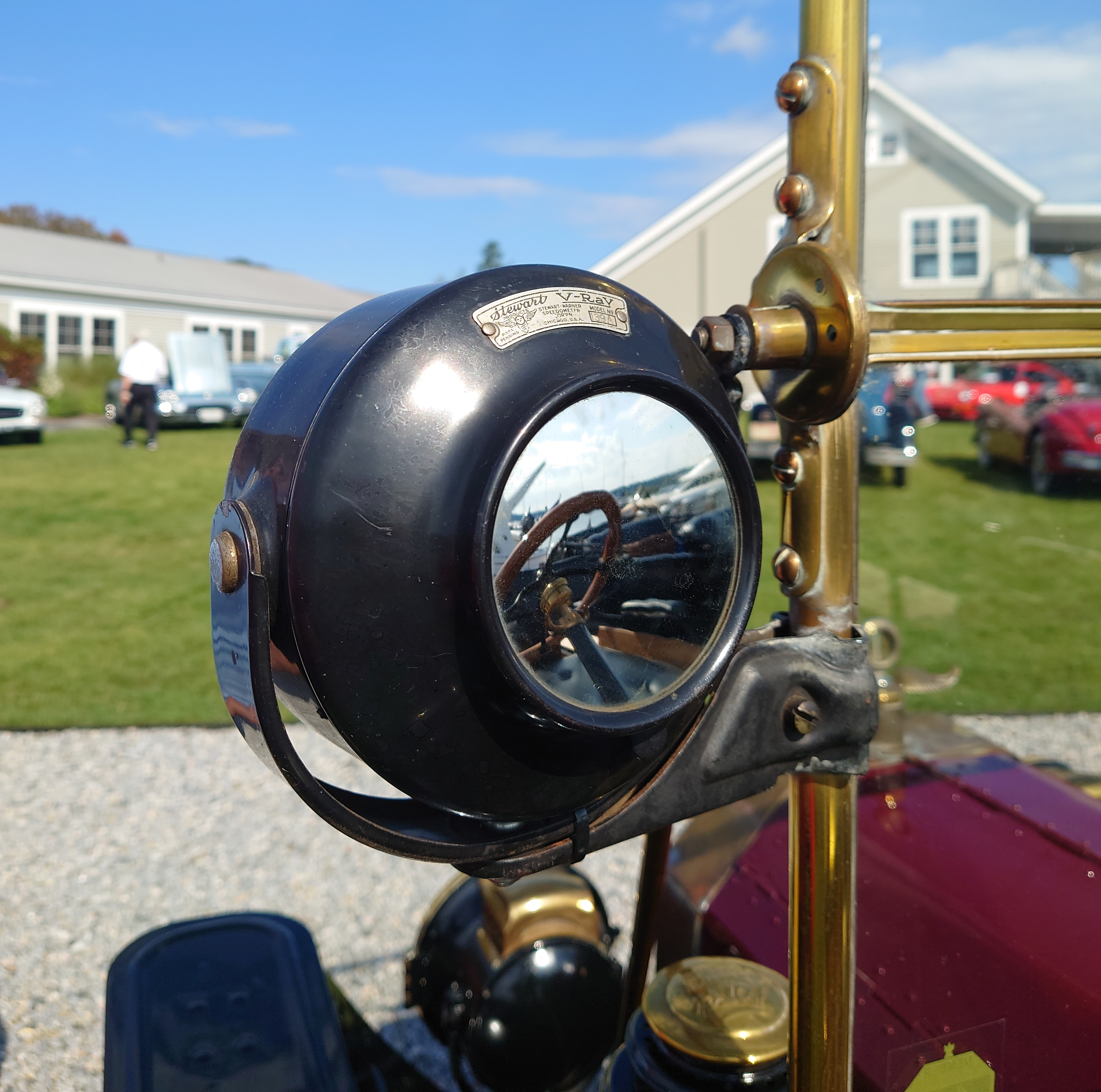
Stewart "V-Ray" headlamp attached to a Ford Model T

Mid-1950s Stewart-Warner automotive instruments in "Hollywood" panel

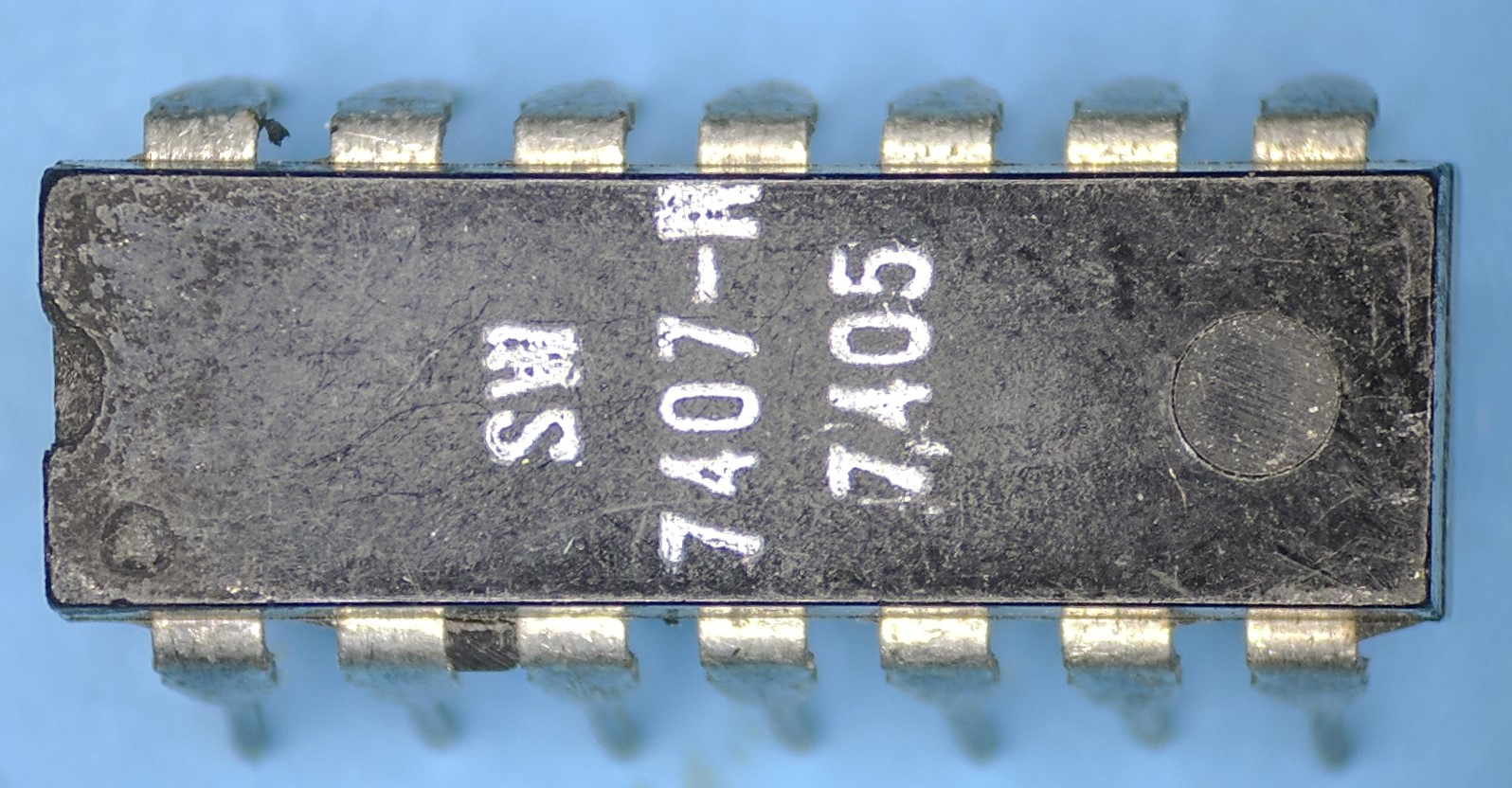
Stewart-Warner 7400 Series integrated circuit

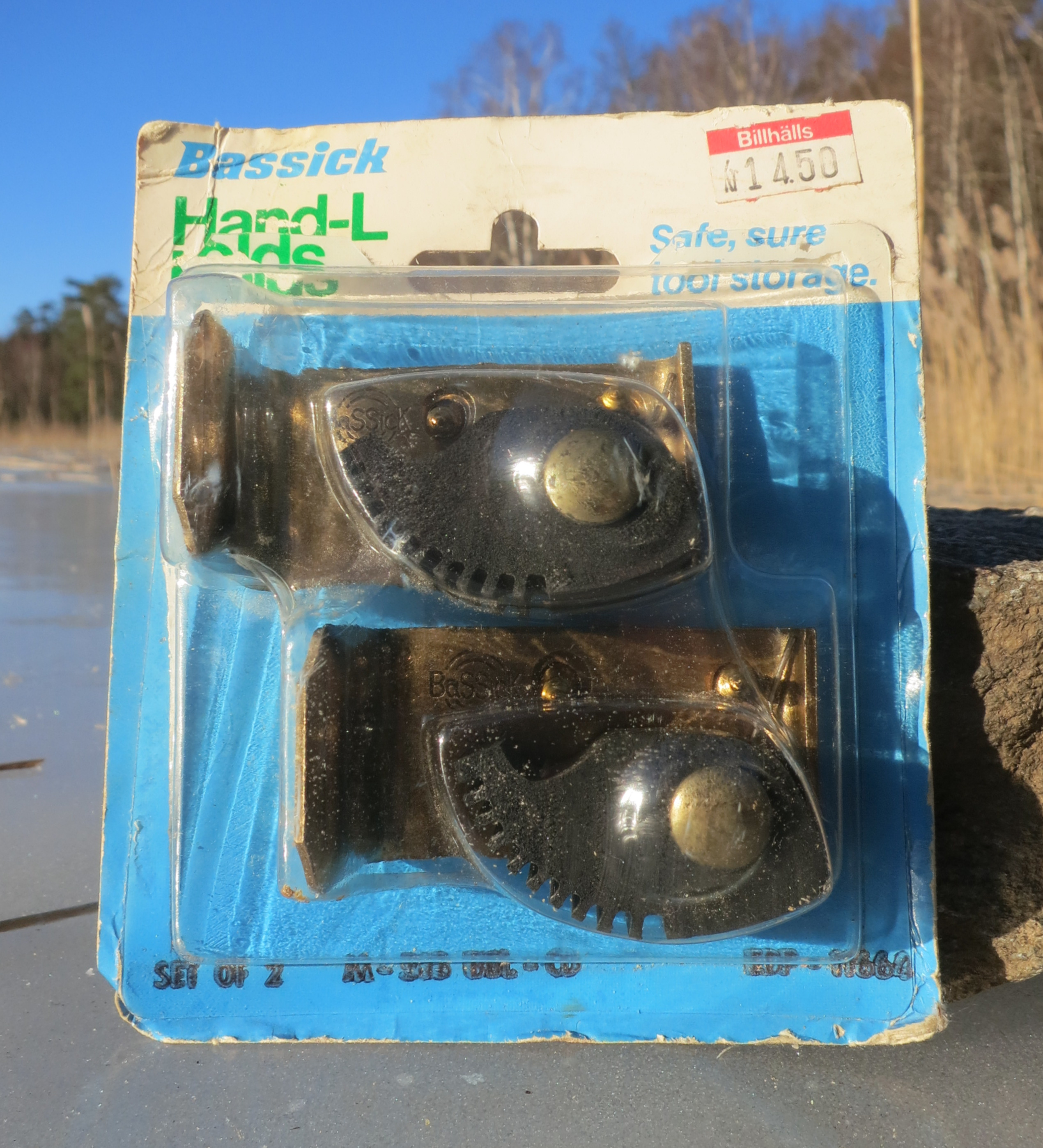
1970s Hand-L tool wall mounts by the Bassick division of Stewart-Warner
