= Detangler =

Bicycle brake mechanism

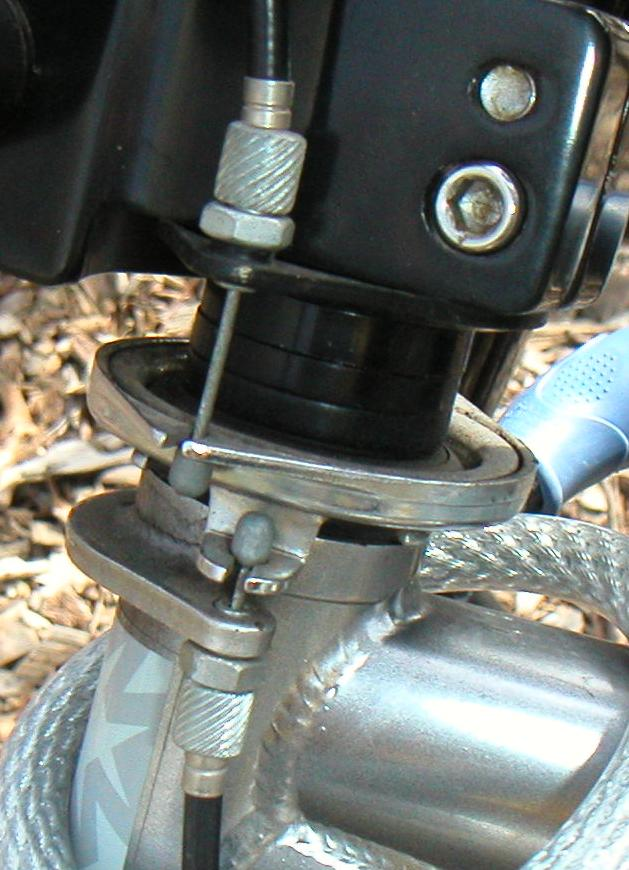
A detangler

The detangler, Gyro or rotor is an invention for the freestyle BMX bicycle, allowing the handlebars to turn a complete 360° rotation without the brake cables getting tangled up.

A detangler is usually only used for the rear brake cable. The front brake cable can be routed through the stem, via a hollow stem bolt known as a Pott's mod bolt, and fork steer tube to avoid the tangling problem.

== How it works ==
The single cable from the handlebar's rear brake lever divides into two cables which are routed to opposite sides of the stem or fork steer tube and into cable stops. The inner cables connect to metal tabs on a disc attached to the upper side of a thrust bearing placed around the stem or steer tube. Squeezing the brake lever pulls the inner cables and causes the bearing assembly to rise. A second disc is attached to the bottom of the thrust bearing such that the entire assembly moves together up and down the steering axis while each disc can rotate independently around the axis. A second set of cables are attached to tabs on this lower disc and pass through cable stops mounted on the either side of the head tube. The two lower cables merge back into one and then are routed to the rear brake. The cables are split in this way to ensure that the detangler mechanism moves equally on both sides.

A simpler, less common variation of the system, termed a dual cables brake, does away with the splitters for the upper and lower cables, instead simply running two cables from the brake lever to the detangler and from there to the brake. While this may improve reliability, it may need more maintenance.

== See also ==
- BMX bike
- Freestyle BMX
- Glossary of cycling
- List of bicycle parts
- Slip ring, an electronics component that allows rotation of a cable penetration
