= List of people associated with Bletchley Park =

This is a list of people associated with Bletchley Park, the principal centre of Allied code-breaking during the Second World War, notable either for their achievements there or elsewhere. In total about 9,000 people worked at Bletchley Park of whom 75 percent were women. Work at or for Bletchley Park is given first, followed by achievements elsewhere in parentheses. Many of the people listed are notable for other careers and accomplishments in addition to their employment at Bletchley Park.

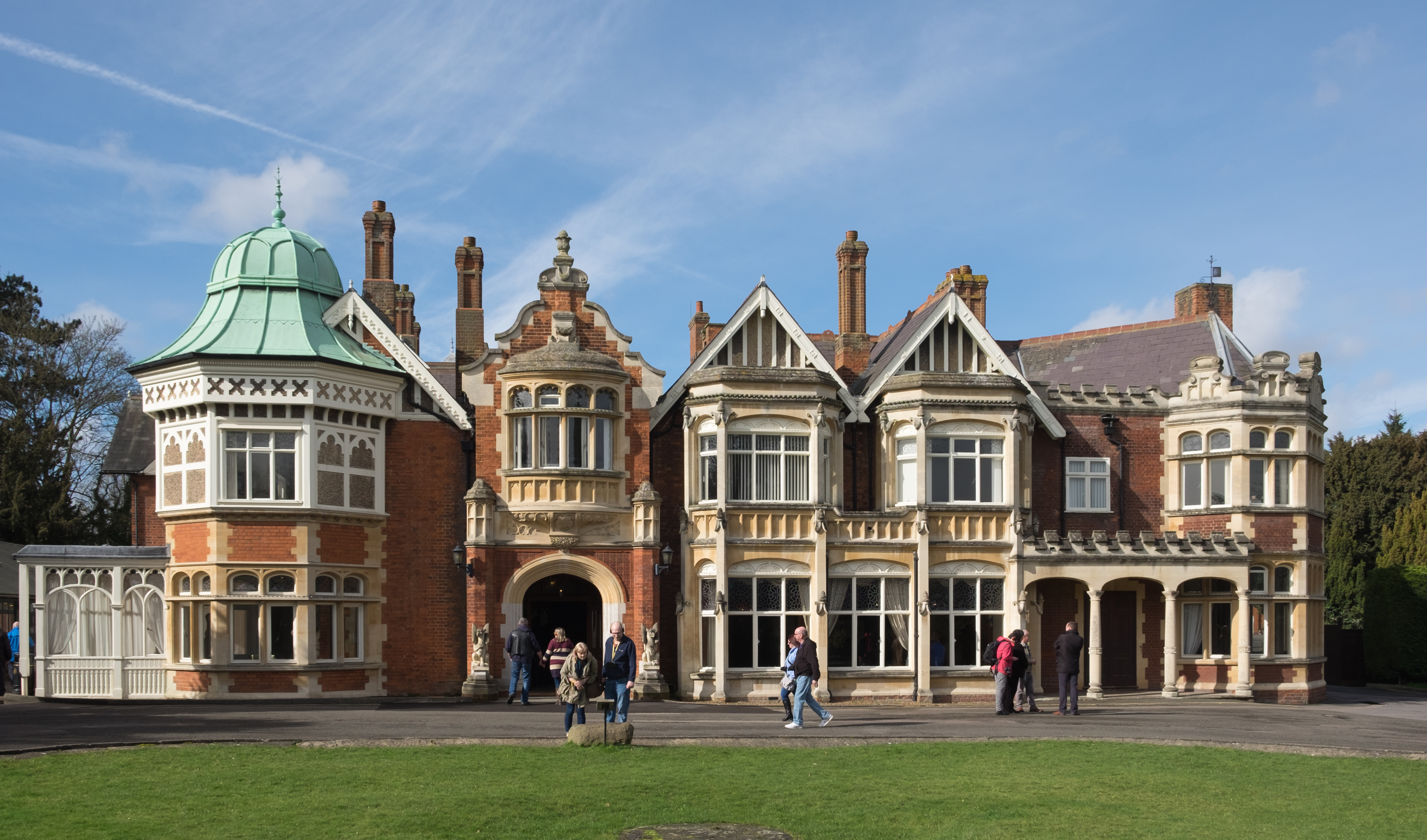
Bletchley Park mansion

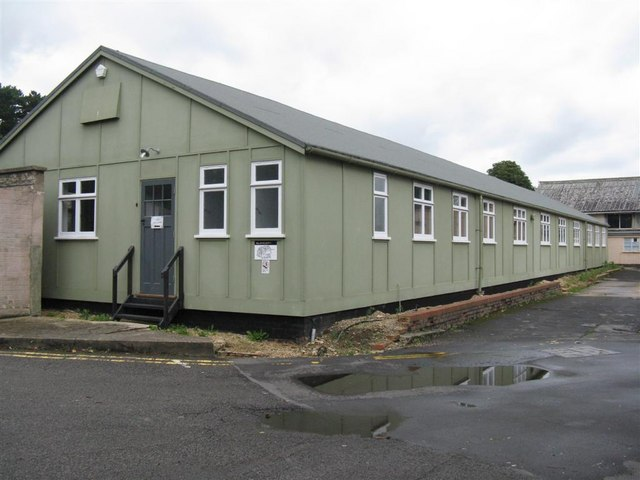
Hut 8, one of the buildings erected in haste on the site during World War II

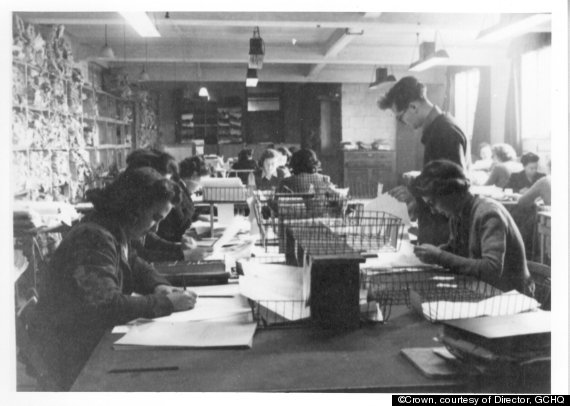
Working at Bletchley Park (BP). Few photos exist of people at work at BP.

== A ==
- Mary Adams, interceptor of German and Italian radio messages
- Sir Frank Ezra Adcock (Professor of Ancient History, Cambridge University)
- Helene Aldwinckle
- Alexander Aitken
- James Macrae Aitken, worked in Hut 6 (Scottish chess champion)
- Hugh Alexander, member of Hut 6 February 1940 – March 1941, later head of Hut 8 (head of the cryptanalysis division at GCHQ; British Chess Champion 1938 and 1956)
- Maurice Allen, at the Wireless Experimental Centre, Delhi; an Oxford don.
- Emily Anderson
- Michael Arbuthnot Ashcroft (codebreaker)
- Stanley Armitage
- Pamela Ascherson, bombe operator (artist), Wren
- Felicity Ashbee
- Anne Asquith
- Arthur Oliver Lonsdale Atkin (mathematician)
- John H. A. Atkins (translator of Japanese, later Head of Modern Languages at Nottingham Trent University)
- Joyce Aylard, Wren, bombe operator at Eastcote, reassigned to Bletchley Park after VE Day

== B ==
- Dennis Babbage, chief cryptanalyst in Hut 6 (mathematician)
- Stepen Banister, Codebreaker in Hut 6 and inventor of the 'BLISTS' or 'Banister Lists' – a register of Enigma messages showing special indicators to facilitate detection of certain items and identify crib messages. (Under Secretary at the Dept of the Environment)
- Rachel Joan Banister (née Rawlence), Codebreaker Hut 6
- Rosemary Bamforth
- Sarah Baring, linguist in Hut 4 (socialite and memoirist)
- Jean Barker, Baroness Trumpington née Jean Alys Campbell-Harris
- J. W. B. Barns, worked in Hut 4, Hut 5 and Block A (Professor of Egyptology, Oxford University)
- Geoffrey Barraclough (Chichele Professor of Modern History, University of Oxford)
- Patricia Bartley
- Keith Batey
- Mavis Batey née Lever, cryptologist (garden and landscape historian, author, former President of the Garden History Society)
- Rodney Bax, an Intelligence Corps captain in the Fusion Room, Hut 3.
- Peter Benenson, worked in the "Testery" (founder of Amnesty International)
- Ralph Bennett, intelligence officer in Hut 3 (Professor of History at Magdalene College, Cambridge and president 1979–82)
- Osla Benning, linguist Hut 4
- Margaret Betts (Bombe operator), Wren
- Francis (Frank) Birch, Head of German Naval Sub-section and Naval Section
- Susan Elizabeth Black
- Carmen Blacker
- T. S. R. Boase (art historian)
- Arthur Bonsall (Director of GCHQ)
- Elsie Booker, Wren, in photo with Dorothy Du Boisson
- Ruth Bourne (née Henry), Bombe operator, Wren (in 2012 she was a volunteer guide at BP
- Edward Boyle, intelligence (Conservative politician)
- Captain A. R. Bradshaw, senior naval officer at BP and in overall charge of administration of BP
- Charles Brasch: Italian section, in Elmers School building and London. New Zealand poet.
- Hilary Brett or Brett-Smith, from Somerville College, Oxford, cryptologist, Hut 8 (Lady Hinsley)
- Lord Asa Briggs, member of the Watch in Hut 6 (historian)
- Audrey Ruth Briggs
- Jean Briggs Watters, English cryptanalyst, Wren
- Christine Brooke-Rose, from Somerville College, Oxford
- Irene Brown
- Tommy Brown, 16-year-old NAAFI canteen assistant who was awarded the George Medal for risking his life in helping Francis Fasson and Colin Grazier in recovering 'short signal' codebooks which provided a breakthrough in cryptanalysis of the German Naval Enigma from the sinking German submarine U-559
- Alan Bruce
- William Bundy, US Army Signal Corps (member of the CIA and foreign affairs advisor to Presidents John F. Kennedy and Lyndon B. Johnson)
- James Ramsay Montagu Butler (politician and historian)

== C ==
- John Cairncross, Soviet spy
- Peter Calvocoressi, intelligence officer (RAF)
- Violet Cane
- Catherine Caughey, Wren
- J. W. S. Cassels
- John Chadwick
- Caroline Chojecki, intelligence database analyst (Soviet Studies Research Centre, Sandhurst database analyst)
- Joan Clarke (later Murray), mathematician (briefly engaged to Alan Turing)
- William Clarke, Head of Naval Section, then of Italian Naval subsection
- Rozanne Colchester
- Tom Colvill, general Manager of the Testery
- Arthur Cooper, British Foreign Office linguist (Chinese and Japanese), FECB then FRUMEL
- Josh Cooper, cryptographer
- Margaret Cooper (née Douglas)
- Michael Crum, worked on the Siemens and Halske T52 teleprinter cipher, codenamed "STURGEON"

== D ==
- Alec Naylor Dakin (cryptographer) worked in hut 4 decrypted premature message about death of Hitler during German assassination attempt
- Phyllis Dalton
- Patricia Davies (codebreaker), special duties linguist in the Women’s Royal Naval Service
- Iris Dawnay
- Dorrit Dekk, Czechoslovak emigrant designer who joined the Wrens and worked as a 'listener' during the war
- Alexander "Alistair" Denniston, Deputy Director of GC&CS
- Irene Dixon
- Nakdimon ("Naky") Doniach, RAF, linguist (later GCHQ and Oxford University)
- Dorothy Du Boisson, operator of the Colossus computer

== E ==
- Peter Edgerley, codebreaker
- Diana Elles, Baroness Elles
- Peter Ericsson, Testery shift-leader, linguist and senior codebreaker
- Margaret "Peggy" Erskine-Tulloch née Seton, one of the first Wrens at Bletchley Park, was a Bombe operator, instructor and watch officer
- John Davies Evans

== F ==
- Maxime de la Falaise
- Alison Fairlie
- Francis Anthony Blair Fasson, Lieutenant RN was posthumously awarded the George Cross for the "outstanding bravery and steadfast devotion to duty in the face of danger" that he displayed on 30 October 1942 in boarding, with Able Seaman Colin Grazier, the sinking U-boat U-559 and recovering 'short signal' codebooks which provided a breakthrough in Cryptanalysis of the German Naval Enigma but losing his life in the process
- Jane Fawcett, was credited with identifying the message that led to the sinking of the battleship Bismarck, a great Allied naval victory
- Harry Fensom, the creator of the British Tunny machine which was used in decoding messages in the Lorenz Cipher
- Lady Jean Fforde
- Harold Fletcher; Hut 6, involved in Bombe administration from August 1941
- Tommy Flowers, post office engineer and designer of the Colossus computer
- Leonard Forster
- Hugh Foss, cryptographer, head of the Japanese Naval Section (Hut 7) from 1942 to 1943
- Freddy (Frederick) Freeborn, ran the Tabulating (index) Section in Block C (formerly Hut 7; former head of BTM's Letchworth factory.
- Alfred Friendly, US Army Air Force (editor of the Washington Post)

== G ==
- Valerie Glassborow, grandmother of Kate Middleton, Princess of Wales, worked in Hut 16 along with her twin sister [12]
- Joshua David Goldberg, Japanese codebreaker, solicitor
- Harry Golombek (chess player)
- I. J. (Jack) Good
- Raymond Goodman, head of one shift in Naval Intelligence under Frank Birch
- Colin Grazier, Able Seaman RN was posthumously awarded the George Cross for the "outstanding bravery and steadfast devotion to duty in the face of danger" that he displayed on 30 October 1942 in boarding, with Lieutenant Francis Fasson, the sinking U-559 and recovering 'short signal' codebooks which provided a breakthrough in Cryptanalysis of the German Naval Enigma but losing his life in the process
- Sigrid Augusta Green
- Jeanne Greenland
- Nigel de Grey, cryptologist, in World War I helped decrypt the Zimmermann Telegram

== H ==
- Philip Hall
- Elisabeth Hardy
- John Herivel, arrived at Bletchley Park in January 1940; discoverer of the "Herivel Tip"; later worked in administration in the "Newmanry" (science historian)
- Peter Hilton, arrived at Bletchley Park in January 1942, worked in Hut 8 until late 1942, moved to Research Section to work on Fish, later in Testery (topologist)
- Harry Hinsley (historian)
- Gwen Hollington, worked in Hut 4, Bletchley Park, translating decrypted German naval communications
- Leonard Hooper (Director of GCHQ)
- Rosalind Hudson
- Rosalind Hudson
- Jodi Hyland
- Dorothy Hyson (American-born West End actress)

== I ==
- Eleanor Ireland
- John Constantine Ivanoff, Cryptanalyst / Translator in the United States Army Signal Corps. Ordered to British Signal Intelligence Services in London, Ivanoff helped decode secret German transmissions.

== J ==
- John Jeffreys, supervised manufacture of perforated sheets; initially in charge of Hut 6 with Welchman until May 1940; died in early 1941 (mathematician)
- Roy Jenkins, codebreaker in the Testery (Labour Member of Parliament and government minister; first British President of the European Commission (1977–81); one of the four principal founders of the Social Democratic Party (SDP) in 1981, ennobled as Baron Jenkins of Hillhead; distinguished writer, especially of biographies)
- Jones, Sergeant (later Squadron Leader); given overall responsibility for Bombe maintenance by Travis.
- Daniel Jones, Japanese, Romanian and Russian codebreaker (Welsh composer)
- Eric Jones, head of Hut 3 (Director of GCHQ)
- Joan Joslin, cryptanalyst whose work helped lead to the sinking of the Scharnhorst

== K ==
- Harold Keen, BTM engineer who built the British bombes
- Marjorie Jean Oswald Kennedy
- Dilly Knox, leading cryptologist, cracked the code of the commercial Enigma machines used in the Spanish Civil War, one of the British participants in the conference in which the Poles disclosed to their French and British allies their achievements in Enigma decryption, broke the Abwehr non-steckered Enigma
- Solomon Kullback, American mathematician and cryptologist who visited Bletchley Park in May 1942 and cooperated with the British in the solution of more conventional German codebook-based systems. Shortly after his return to the US, Kullback moved into the Japanese section as its chief, and later joined the National Security Agency.

== L ==
- Leslie Lambert (short story writer as A. J. Alan)
- Peter Laslett
- Hugh Last (Professor of Ancient History at Brasenose College, Oxford)
- F. L. ("Peter") Lucas, Hut 3 1939–45, translator and intelligence-analyst, acting head Hut 3, C.O. BP Home Guard (writer; lecturer in literature, King's College, Cambridge)
- Arnold Lynch

== M ==
- Sir John Marriott (philatelist)
- Peter Marr-Johnston headed Wireless Experimental Centre, Delhi; British Army officer.
- Victor Masters, Testery shift-leader and senior codebreaker
- Barbara Mauritzen
- Ailsa Maxwell
- Cicely Mayhew
- Joan Louisa McLean, Leading Wren 45270, wartime morse code operator
- George McVittie, Air Section, Head of Meteorological Sub-section. (Professor of Astronomy at the University of Illinois)
- Stewart Menzies, non-operational Director of GC&CS (head of Secret Intelligence Service)
- Donald Michie, joined BP in the early summer of 1942' later worked with Colossus; had the idea for modifying it to become Colossus II, which could tackle 'wheel patterns' in addition to 'wheel settings'
- Valerie Middleton
- Stuart Milner-Barry, member of Hut 6 from early 1940 to the end of the war; head of Hut 6 from Autumn 1943 (chess player and civil servant)
- Ann Katharine Mitchell

== N ==
- Max Newman, head of the "Newmanry" (topologist)
- Brinley ("Bryn") Newton-John (father of Olivia Newton-John)
- Rolf Noskwith, cryptographer
- Wilfrid Noyce, wartime Intelligence Officer, cryptanalyst (climber, 1953 Mt Everest expedition; knew Alan Turing)

== O ==
- Denis Oswald, linguist and senior codebreaker

== P ==
- Marion Paton
- Thaddeus ("Teddy") Pilley, RAF Intelligence Officer, linguist in Hut 3 (was made Officier d’Academie by France; helped found the International Association of Conference Interpreters and the Institute of Linguists; founded and ran the Linguists' Club)
- John H. Plumb
- Lewis Franklin Powell Jr., US Army (member of the US Supreme Court)
- F.T. Prince (poet)

== R ==
- Henry Reed, translator (poet and radio dramatist)
- David Rees, Hut 6 (mathematician)
- Marian Rejewski, Polish mathematician and cryptologist
- Grafton Melville Richards, ISOS, cryptographer, linguist and academic (Welsh and Celtic Studies). Author of Welsh language novel Y Gelyn Mewnol (The Enemy Within), (1943), Llandybie: Llyfrau'r Dryw.
- Jerry Roberts, Testery shift-leader, linguist and senior codebreaker
- James Robertson, Blocks A and F, Air Section. Ran BP Recreational Club Choral Society (Director of the Sadler's Wells Opera Company)
- Alison Robins, Wren
- Margaret Rock, mathematician
- Jim Rose, Hut 3, later journalist and campaigner
- Pamela Rose, Hut 4 and Naval records, earlier actress, later school counsellor and charity chair
- Bob Roseveare, Hut 6 (schoolteacher)
- Ione Roseveare
- Elizabeth Nesta Ross
- Miriam Louisa Rothschild, author and scientist
- Mair Russell-Jones, cryptanalyst in Hut 6, working on the Enigma cipher.

== S ==
- John Saltmarsh (historian)
- Margot Sandeman
- Anne Segrave (née Anne Hamilton-Grace; was indexer in Hut 3.in 1942,43, worked under F.L. Lucas, then Lavers; received a proposal of marriage from Ralph Tymms)
- Mercy Seiradaki
- Phoebe Senyard, b. 1891, Foreign office employee, worked at Bletchley from 1939-1945, among other tasks was personal assistant to Frank Birch and head of Secretariat.
- D. R. Shackleton Bailey
- Arthur Shaw (cryptographer); RN, at the Far East Combined Bureau, founder and head of diplomatic section.
- Edward H. Simpson, cryptanalyst and mathematical statistician
- Admiral Hugh Sinclair, non-operational Director of GC&CS (head of Secret Intelligence Service)
- Howard Smith (director general of MI5)
- Joan Stafford-King-Harman
- Francis Hayward Stanton
- Rosemary Brown Stanton
- Rena Stewart
- Oliver Strachey, head of the section deciphering Abwehr messages
- Alan Stripp, worked on Japanese codes (author of Codebreaker in the Far East)
- Sadie Stuart

== T ==
- Joy Tamblin (Director of the Women's Royal Air Force)
- Derek Taunt, arrived in Bletchley Park in August 1941, worked in Hut 6 (mathematician, later bursar of Jesus College, Cambridge)
- Telford Taylor, US Army (Counsel for the Prosecution at the Nuremberg Trials)
- Ralph Tester, linguist, head of the Testery and member of a TICOM team (accountant with Unilever)
- Mother Thekla
- Joan Thirsk
- Clara Grace Thornton
- John Tiltman
- Edward Travis
- Michael Trumm
- Alan Turing, mathematician, logician, cryptanalyst, designer of the bombe, head of Hut 8 (pioneering computer scientist)
- W. T. Tutte
- Peter Twinn, first British cryptographer to read a German military Enigma message; became the head of the Abwehr Enigma section
- Ralph Tymms

== V ==
- Jean Valentine, leading WRNS, Bombe operator
- Langdon Van Norden, US Army Signal Corps (chairman of the board of the Metropolitan Opera Association)
- Doreen Valiente

== W ==
- Gwen Watkins, codebreaker for Luftwaffe codes, member of Women's Auxiliary Air Force (WAAF)
- Vernon Watkins, codebreaker for Luftwaffe codes
- Betty Webb (code breaker) member of the ATS (Auxiliary Territorial Service) then moved to Bletchley Park to help decipher Japanese and German encrypted messages
- Neil Leslie Webster, major in SIXTA, signals intelligence and codebreaking
- Gordon Welchman, initially in charge of Hut 6 with Jeffreys, became official head of the section until Autumn 1943; later Assistant Director of Mechanisation at Bletchley Park (author of The Hut Six Story, worked on secure communications systems for US forces)
- J. H. C. Whitehead, Newmanry mathematician (topologist, one of the founders of homotopy theory)
- Bernard Willson, academic, worked in Hut 4 on Italian and Japanese codes
- Angus Wilson (novelist and short story writer)
- F. W. Winterbotham, RAF Intelligence Officer, responsible for devising SLU system for secure dissemination of Ultra (author of The Ultra Secret)
- Shaun Wylie, arrived at Bletchley in February 1941, head of crib section in Hut 8, transferred in Autumn 1943 to work on Tunny (topologist, mathematics lecturer at Cambridge, and head of mathematics at GCHQ)
- C. E. Wynn-Williams (physicist from the TRE; designed the electronic counters used in the Newmanry's Robinson machines and Colossus computers

== Y ==
- Leslie Yoxall, Hut 8, devised Yoxallismus technique

== See also ==
- List of women in Bletchley Park
- See Hut 7 for a list of those associated with Japanese codes and either the Far East Combined Bureau or Wireless Experimental Centre in the Far East.
- Wrens at Bletchley Park
