= List of women in Bletchley Park =

Women made up about three-fourths of the 9,000 people who worked at Bletchley Park. Bletchey Park was a mansion and country estate about 50 miles (80 km) north of London. During World War II, it was the principal centre for Allied attempts to break the military and government codes of the Axis powers, especially Nazi Germany. Bletchley's success was an important factor in the victory of the Allies. Most women were employed in clerical or secretarial jobs, but a few dozen became prominent for their code-breaking and management accomplishments. Bletchley Park and its activities were closely guarded secrets during the war. Bletchley Park's existence and accomplishments were not revealed until the mid 1970s.

The following is a list of women who worked at Bletchley Park.

== List ==
- Mary Adams
- Helene Aldwinckle
- Margaret Allan (racing driver)
- Emily Anderson
- Pamela Ascherson
- Felicity Ashbee
- Anne Asquith
- Joyce Aylard
- Sarah Baring
- Mavis Batey
- Osla Benning
- Margaret Betts (Bombe operator)
- Susan Elizabeth Black
- Carmen Blacker
- Ruth Bourne
- Jean Briggs Watters
- Audrey Ruth Briggs
- Christine Brooke-Rose
- Irene Brown (Irene Young)
- Violet Cane
- Catherine Caughey
- Joan Clarke
- Caroline Chojecki
- Rozanne Colchester
- Margaret Cooper
- Phyllis Dalton
- Patricia Davies (codebreaker)
- Iris Dawnay
- Dorrit Dekk
- Irene Dixon
- Dorothy Du Boisson
- Diana Elles, Baroness Elles
- Maxime de la Falaise
- Lady Jean Fforde
- Jane Fawcett
- Kathleen Godfrey
- Sigrid Augusta Green
- Jeanne Patricia Greenland
- Elisabeth Hardy
- Gwen Hollington
- Ethel Houston
- Rosalind Hudson
- Jodi Hyland
- Dorothy Hyson
- Eleanor Ireland
- Joan Joslin
- Marjorie Kennedy
- Barbara Mauritzen
- Ailsa Maxwell (née Macdonald)
- Cicely Mayhew
- Joan McLean
- Valerie Middleton
- Ann Katharine Mitchell
- Betty O'Connell
- Marion Paton
- Ellen Elizabeth Reed
- Alison Robins
- Margaret Rock
- Pamela Rose
- Ione Roseveare
- Elizabeth Nesta Ross
- Miriam Rothschild
- Mair Russell-Jones
- Margot Sandeman
- Philippa Scott
- Mercy Seiradaki
- Phoebe Senyard
- Joan Stafford-King-Harman
- Rosemary Brown Stanton
- Rena Stewart
- Joy Tamblin
- Joan Thirsk
- Mother Thekla
- Joan Thirsk
- Clara Grace Thornton
- Pam Torrens
- Jean Barker, Baroness Trumpington
- Doreen Valiente
- Jean Valentine (bombe operator)
- Gwen Watkins
- Betty Webb (code breaker)

== See also ==
- List of people associated with Bletchley Park
- Women in Bletchley Park
- Wrens at Bletchley Park
