= Betty O'Connell =

Margaret Elizabeth O'Connell
- Born: Margaret Elizabeth Oliver; 25 July 1925; Coventry, Warwickshire, England
- Died: 24 July 2021 (aged 95)
- Education: Calder Girls’ School in Seascale
- Known for: Colossus computer operator Bletchley Park
- Spouse: Guy O'Connell (m. 1959)

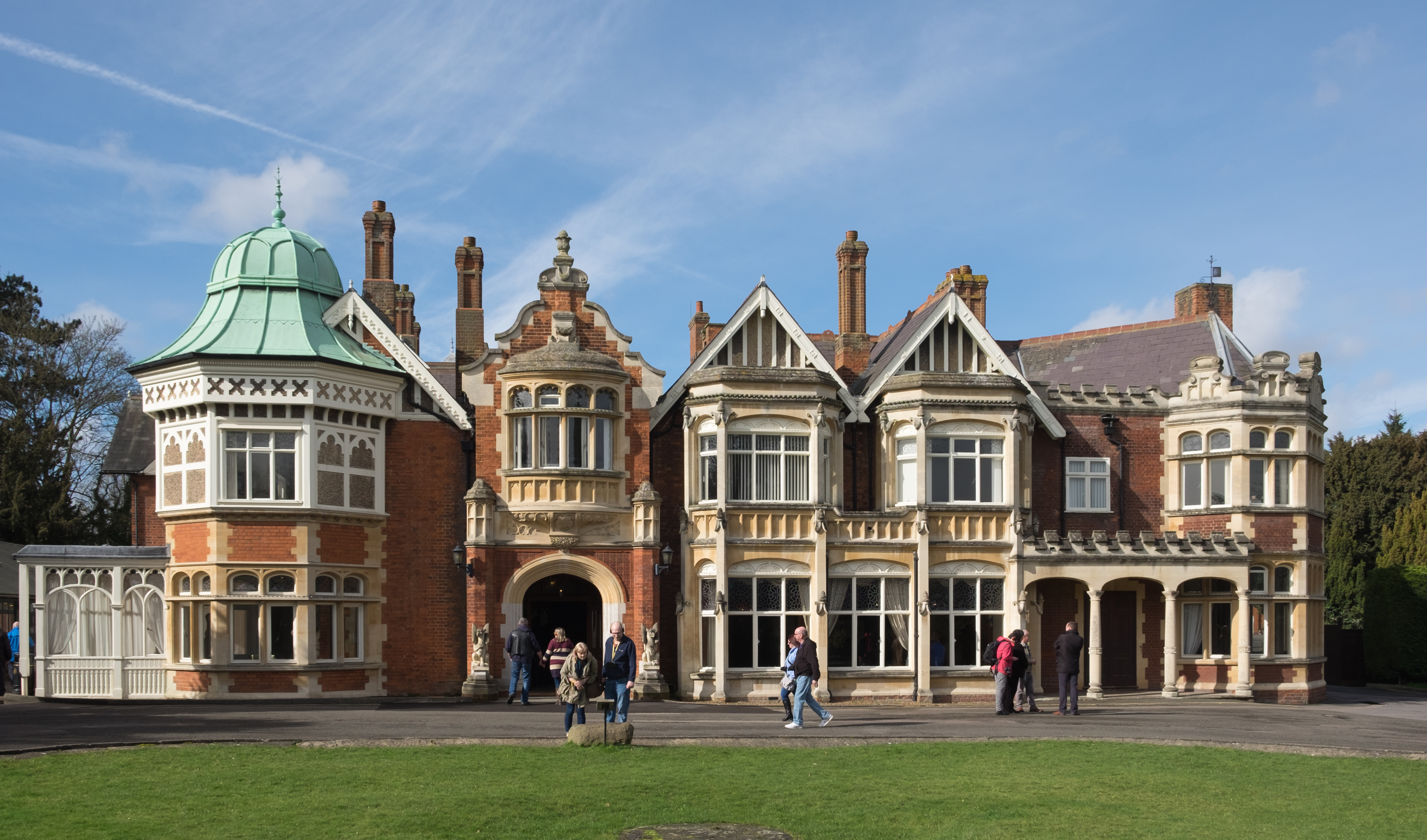
Bletchley Park Mansion

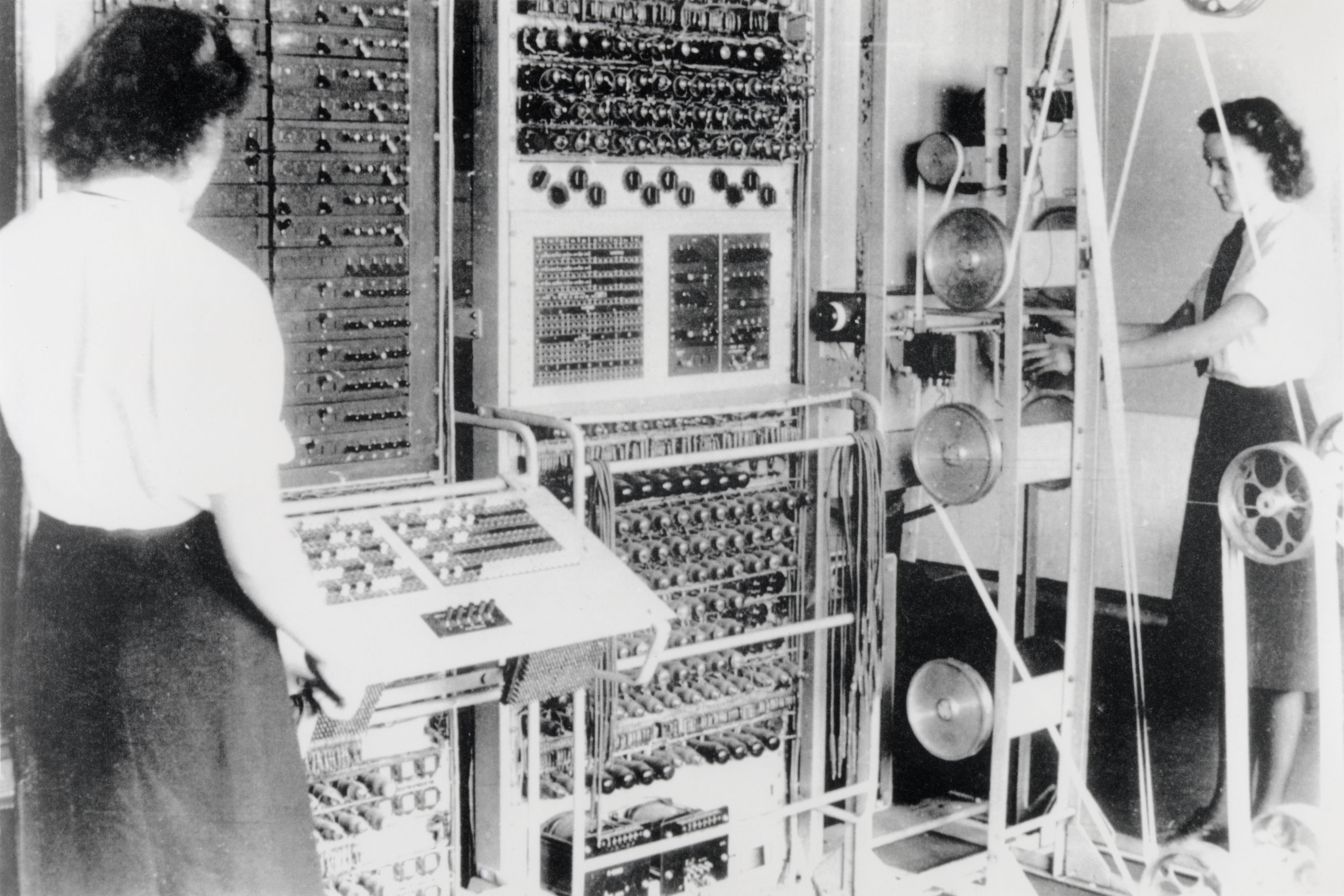
A Colossus computer Mark 2 being operated by Wrens at Bletchley Park, similar to the one operated by O'Connell during World War II (she operated a Mark 1)

Margaret Elizabeth O'Connell (née Oliver; 25 July 1925 - 24 July 2021), better known as Betty O'Connell, was a Colossus computer operator at Bletchley Park during World War II.

== Early life and education ==
Margaret Elizabeth Oliver was born in Coventry in 1925, the second of four children of Ann (née Bennett) and Christopher Oliver, an aircraft engineer. As World War II approached, her family moved near Whitehaven in Cumbria. She attended Calder Girls' School in Seascale, where she was head girl and captain of the tennis, hockey, and cricket teams. Unable to attend university due to the war, she became a Wren (Women's Royal Naval Service) volunteer at age 17.

== Codebreaking ==
Partly because of her ability to solve crossword puzzles, O'Connell was assigned to Bletchley Park in 1942, working in the Newmanry, Max Newman's section to automate codebreaking. The first Colossus computer was installed at Newmanry in early 1944. O'Connell was a member of the Colossus C Watch, a group of 39 women assigned to work on the Colossus computer. O'Connell remained at Bletchley until 1945.

== Personal life ==
In 1958, while playing tennis in Putney, Betty met Guy O'Connell, a former Royal Marine commando, and they married a year later. In 1974, the family moved to Tehran, Iran. Guy died in 1977 and Betty moved back to Britain. The couple had three children.

== See also ==
- Women in Bletchley Park
- List of women in Bletchley Park
- Wrens at Bletchley Park
