= Pam Torrens =

- Born: Pamela Iris Watson; 20 September 1924; Southampton, England
- Died: 3 April 2022 (aged 97)
- Known for: Intercept Operator at Bletchley Park
- Spouse: Patrick Torrens (m. 1975)

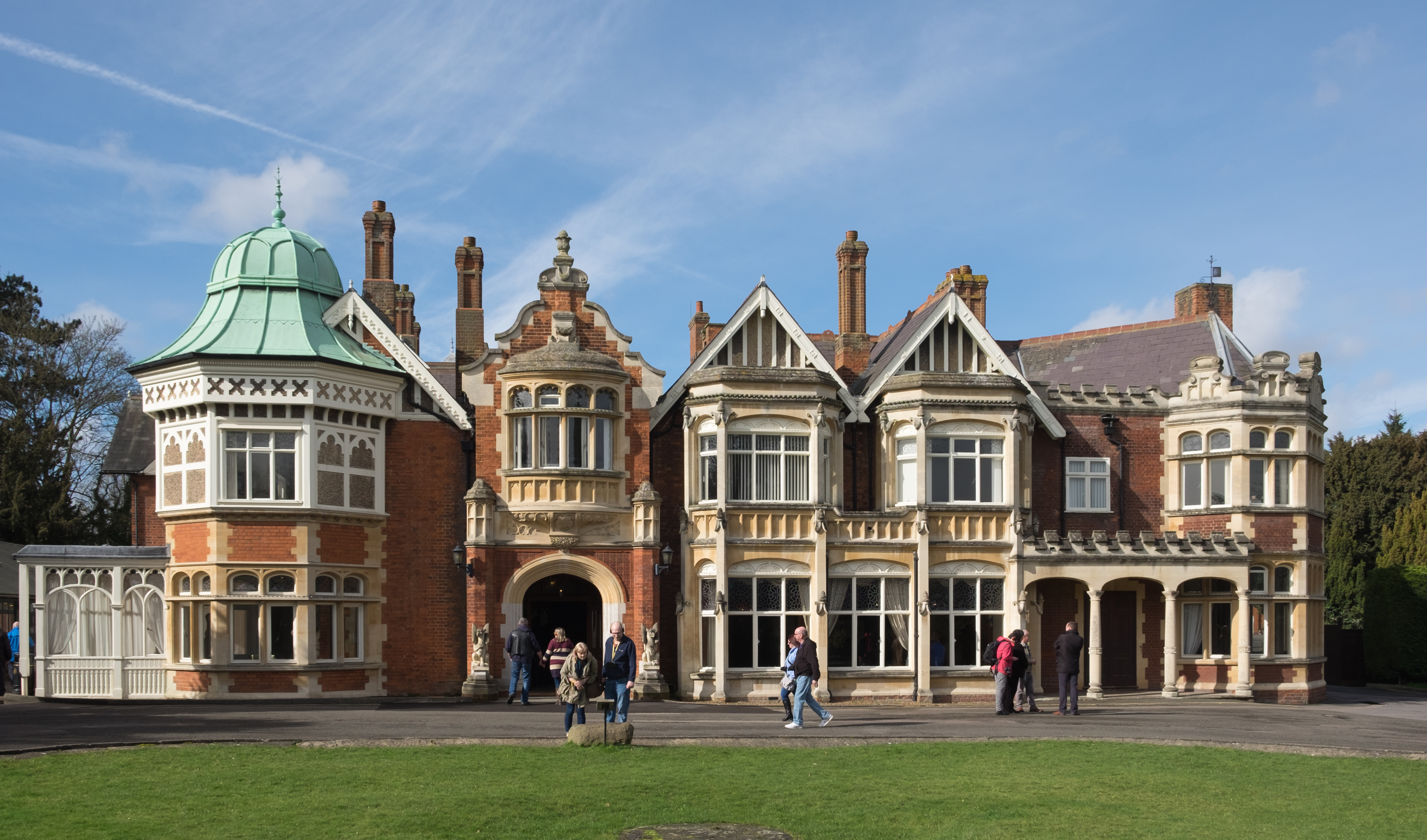
Bletchley Park Mansion

Pam Torrens (née Watson; 20 September 1924 - 3 April 2022) was an Intercept Operator at Bletchley Park during World War II.

== Early life and education ==
Pam Torrens was born Pamela Iris Watson in Southampton, England in 1924. Her father was Captain C H Watson OBE, a Trinity House pilot.

== Codebreaking ==
In 1942, after answering an Admiralty appeal over the BBC for German speakers, Torrens enlisted in the Women's Royal Naval Service (WRNS, known as the Wrens). She was recruited into the naval Y service at Abbots Cliff, near Dover in Kent to listen to German E-boats. The Y service was a network of British signals intelligence collection sites, Abbots Cliff being one of them. Torrens listened to German VHF communications and sent her findings to Bletchley Park (which at the time she only knew as "Station X"). Detachments included Ventnor, Gorleston, Hemsby and Admiralty.

== Personal life ==
After the war Torrens studied at the University of Glasgow and became a teacher. She married Patrick Torrens in 1975.

== See also ==
- Women in Bletchley Park
- List of women in Bletchley Park
- Wrens at Bletchley Park
