= Margaret Betts (Bombe operator) =

- Born: 27 December 1923; Ipswich
- Died: 26 August 2023 (aged 99)
- Education: Ipswich High School, Suffolk
- Known for: Bombe operator at Bletchley Park
- Spouse: Antony Betts (né Sneezum)

Margaret Betts (née Booth; 27 December 1923 - 26 August 2023) was a Bombe operator at Bletchley Park during World War II.

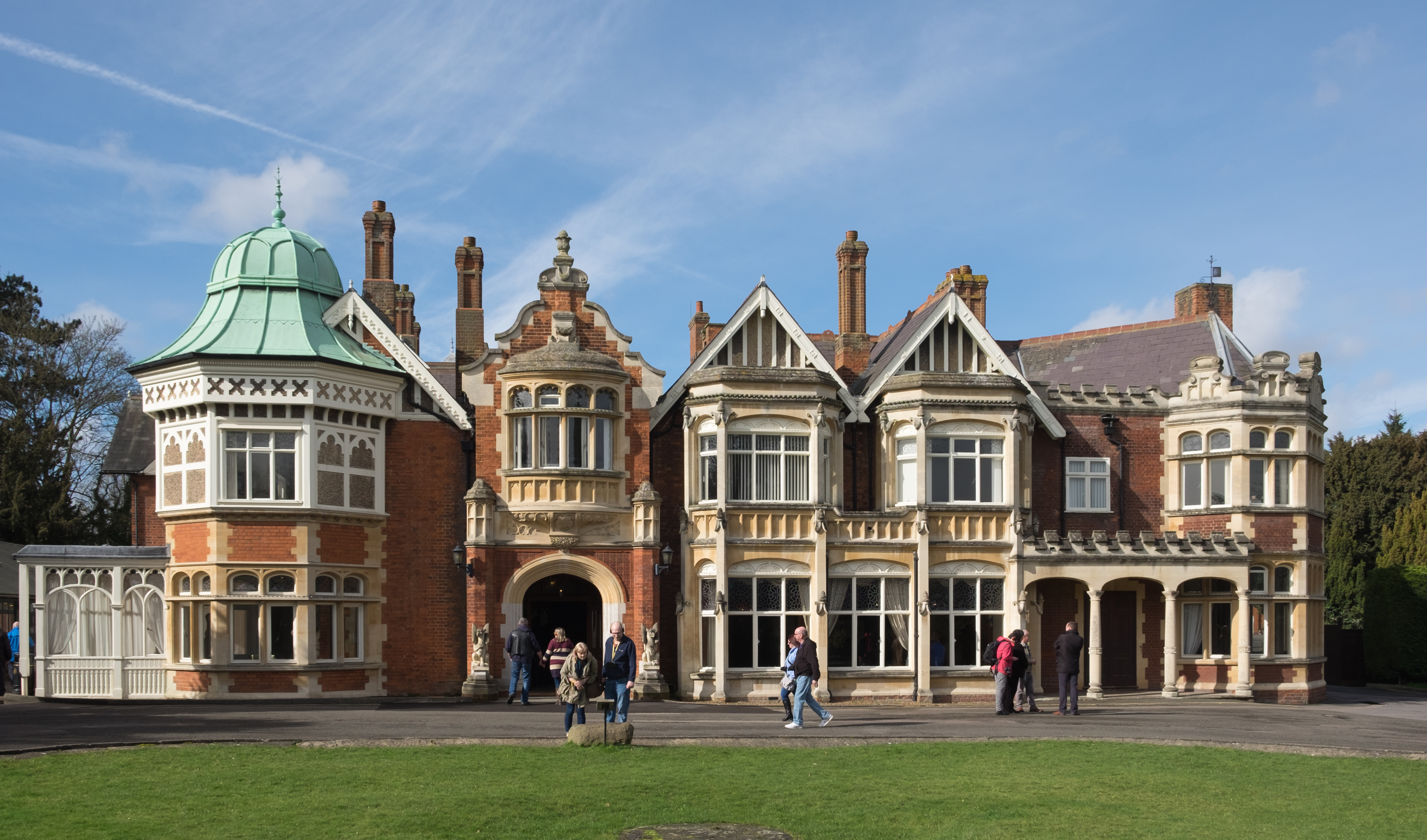
Bletchley Park Mansion

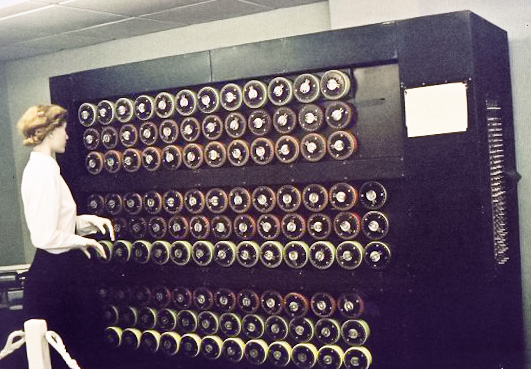
A mockup of a bombe at Bletchley Park, as operated by Betts during World War II

== Early life and education ==
Margaret Betts was born on December 27 1923 in the port town of Ipswich in Suffolk, England. Her parents were Daniel and Dorothy (née Cubitt) Booth. She and her two brothers Patrick and John won scholarships and attended Ipswich High School, Suffolk.

== Codebreaking ==
In 1942 her older and newly married brother Patrick was reported missing and presumed dead after his ship MV Abosso was sunk by a German U-boat. She was determined to become involved in the war and at the age of 19 enlisted in the Women's Royal Naval Service (WRNS, known as the Wrens).

After a selection process she started codebreaking in the summer of 1943. Originally assigned to Eastcote and Gayhurst she became a Bombe operator at Bletchley Park starting in mid 1945. On VE Day she was asked to stay on and work on Japanese codes until VJ Day.

== Personal life ==
In 1947 she married Antony Sneezum. After marriage they changed their name to Betts. Antony had been a prisoner of war and survived forced labor by the Japanese on the Burma Railway (called the Death Railway). He died in 1994.

== See also ==
- Women in Bletchley Park
- List of women in Bletchley Park
- Wrens at Bletchley Park
