= Marjorie Kennedy =

Marjorie Kennedy may refer to:

- Marjory Kennedy-Fraser (1857–1930), Scottish singer, composer and music teacher
- Marjorie Kennedy (librarian) (1915–2002), Scottish librarian
