= Betty Webb (code breaker) =

English code breaker (1923–2025)

Betty Webb MBE
- Born: Charlotte Elizabeth Vine-Stevens; 13 May 1923; Richard's Castle, Herefordshire, England
- Died: 31 March 2025 (aged 101)
- Allegiance: United Kingdom
- Service: Auxiliary Territorial Service
- Service years: 1941–1945
- Awards: Legion d'Honneur; MBE

Charlotte Elizabeth Webb (née Vine-Stevens; 13 May 1923 – 31 March 2025) was an English code breaker who worked at Bletchley Park during World War II from the age of 18. In 1941 she joined the British Auxiliary Territorial Service. She said, of joining the top-secret mission at Bletchley, "I wanted to do something more for the war effort than bake sausage rolls."

== Early life ==
Webb was born on 13 May 1923, in Ryecroft, Richard's Castle, Herefordshire. She was named after her mother, Charlotte, but was commonly referred to as "Betty". She described her childhood as 'idyllic' and was home-schooled for a significant portion of her youth. Her mother gave her and her brother home-school lessons. She was studying Domestic Science at Radbrook College in Shrewsbury at the start of World War II. She signed up to join the Auxiliary Territorial Service as soon as she turned 18 in May 1941, and did basic training at the Royal Welch Fusiliers' Hightown Barracks in Wrexham. From there she was taken to an interview in London at Devonshire House and then sent immediately to Bletchley Park in Buckinghamshire.

== World War II and Bletchley Park ==
Upon arrival at Bletchley Park, she was tasked with cataloguing encrypted German radio messages intercepted by the British, contributing to the breaking of the German cipher Enigma. While a bulk of Bletchley Park workers were assigned to one of the huts, such as Hut 3, Hut 11, Webb was mainly situated in the Mansion belonging to Major Tester's department and Block F, the Japanese section. In Major Tester's department, some tasks performed include registering messages on little cards, which Webb believes totalled 10,000 a day in the whole park, and organizing the cards into shoeboxes according to a strict order so they could be retrieved efficiently when called for. In Block F, she worked on intercepted Japanese messages, something she excelled at so much that she was later sent to Washington to support the American war effort.

All recruits to Bletchley Park were taken into a room and asked to read and then sign the Official Secrets Act before they could begin their work. The strict secrecy meant workers could not share what they did at work with their families, friends, or even with their fellow Bletchley workers. Only after the veil of secrecy was partially lifted, in the late 1970s, were Betty Webb and others who had worked at Bletchley, finally able to understand what had really been going on at the site.

== Later life, honours and death ==
Webb was appointed a Member of the Order of the British Empire (MBE) in the 2015 Birthday Honours "for services to remembering and promoting the work of Bletchley Park". In 2021 Webb's work at Bletchley Park was recognized by the Government of France, with her appointment as Chevalier de la Légion d'Honneur (Knight of the Legion of Honour).

From 2020, she was an ambassador of Operation Bletchley, a series of walking and codebreaking challenges, raising money for the Army Benevolent Fund. As of February 2021, Webb lived in Worcestershire, England. In 2023, she was invited to King Charles's coronation on 6 May and sat in the front row. She turned 100 in May 2023 and celebrated her birthday with a party at Bletchley Park, which involved a flypast by an Avro Lancaster bomber.

Webb died on 31 March 2025, aged 101.

== Works ==
- Webb, Betty (2023). No More Secrets: My Part in Codebreaking at Bletchley Park and the Pentagon. Ad Lib Publishers Limited. ISBN 978-1837-7002-19.
- Webb, Charlotte (2014). Secret Postings: Bletchley Park to the Pentagon. BookTower Publishing. ISBN 978-0955-7164-78.

== See also ==
- Women in Bletchley Park
- List of women in Bletchley Park
