= Elizabeth Nesta Ross =

- Born: Margaret Elizabeth Oliver; 22 January 1924; Nairobi, Kenya
- Died: 10 January 2023 (aged 97)
- Education: University of Oxford
- Known for: Codebreaker at Bletchley Park
- Spouse: John Moullin Davies (m. 1950)

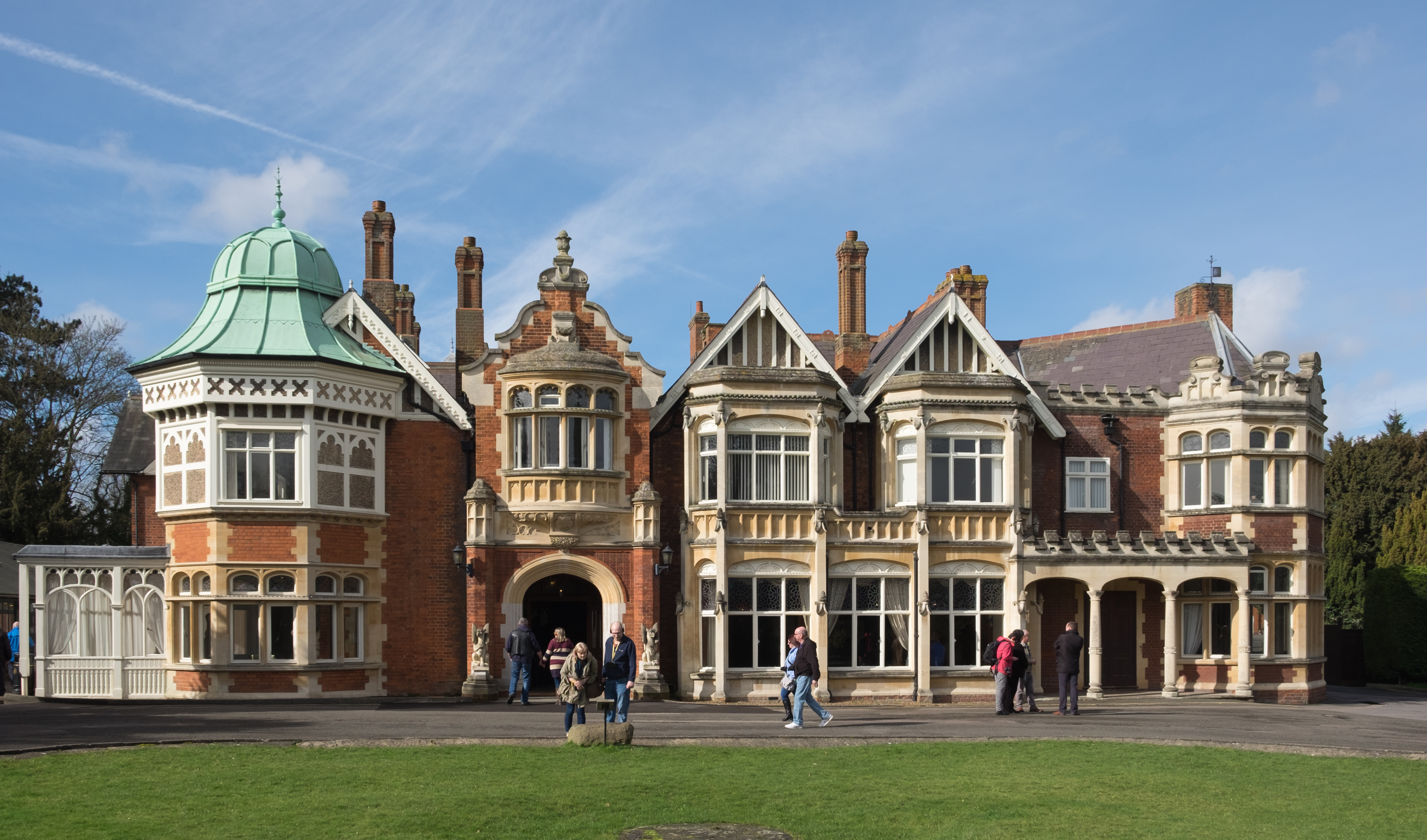
Bletchley Park Mansion

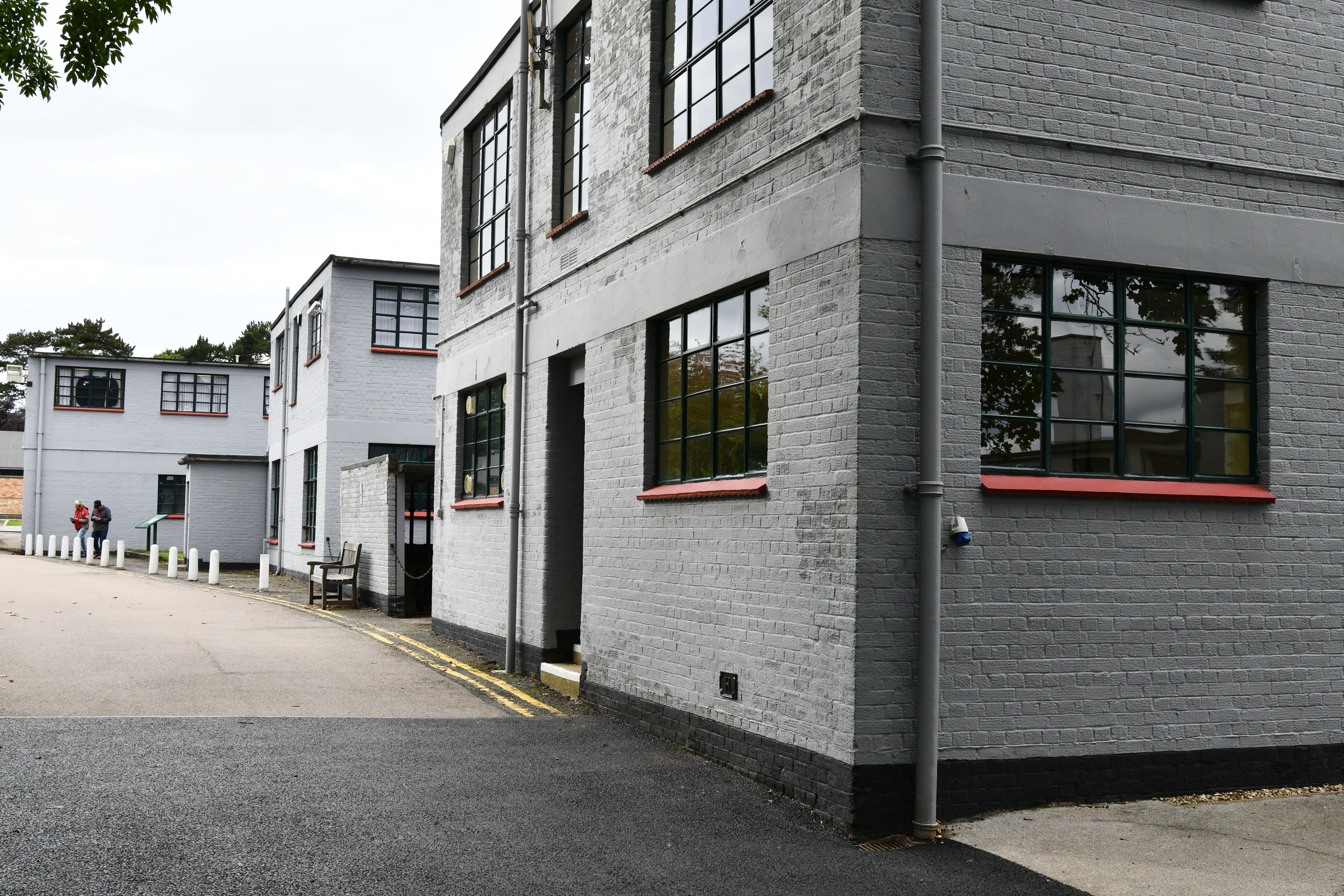
Block A, Bletchley Park

Elizabeth Nesta Ross (22 January 1924 - 10 January 2023) broke Japanese merchant-shipping codes at Bletchley Park during World War II before going on to become an actress.

== Early life and education ==
Elizabeth Ross was born in Nairobi, Kenya in 1924. Her father Sandford was a member of the Colonial Service.

== Bletchley Park ==
After one year at Oxford studying medicine Ross was recruited in 1944. She completed a six-week course in Japanese and began work on the Japanese JN40 merchant-shipping codes in Hut 7 (later Block A) at Bletchley Park.

== Acting ==
She was released from Bletchley in 1945 and joined Donald Wolfit’s touring company. After marrying in 1950 she stepped away from acting for 30 years. After her retirement she returned to acting. In addition to appearances in Casualty, EastEnders, and Keeping Up Appearances she appeared alongside Gary Lineker in a Walker Crisps commercial.

== Personal life ==
She met John Moullin Davies in Oxford and they were married in 1950. At 53 Ross returned to Oxford to gain a degree in Education and Drama. She taught English, drama, and theatre arts at Oxford High School until compulsory retirement in 1982. John died in 2008. They had four children.

== See also ==
- Women in Bletchley Park
- List of women in Bletchley Park
