= Caroline Chojecki =

Caroline Chojecki MBE
- Born: Caroline Elizabeth Rowett; 11 November 1920; Bayswater, England
- Died: 24 September 2017 (aged 96)
- Education: University of Cambridge
- Known for: Naval intelligence analyst at Bletchley Park
- Spouse: Zygmunt Chojecki (m. 1953)

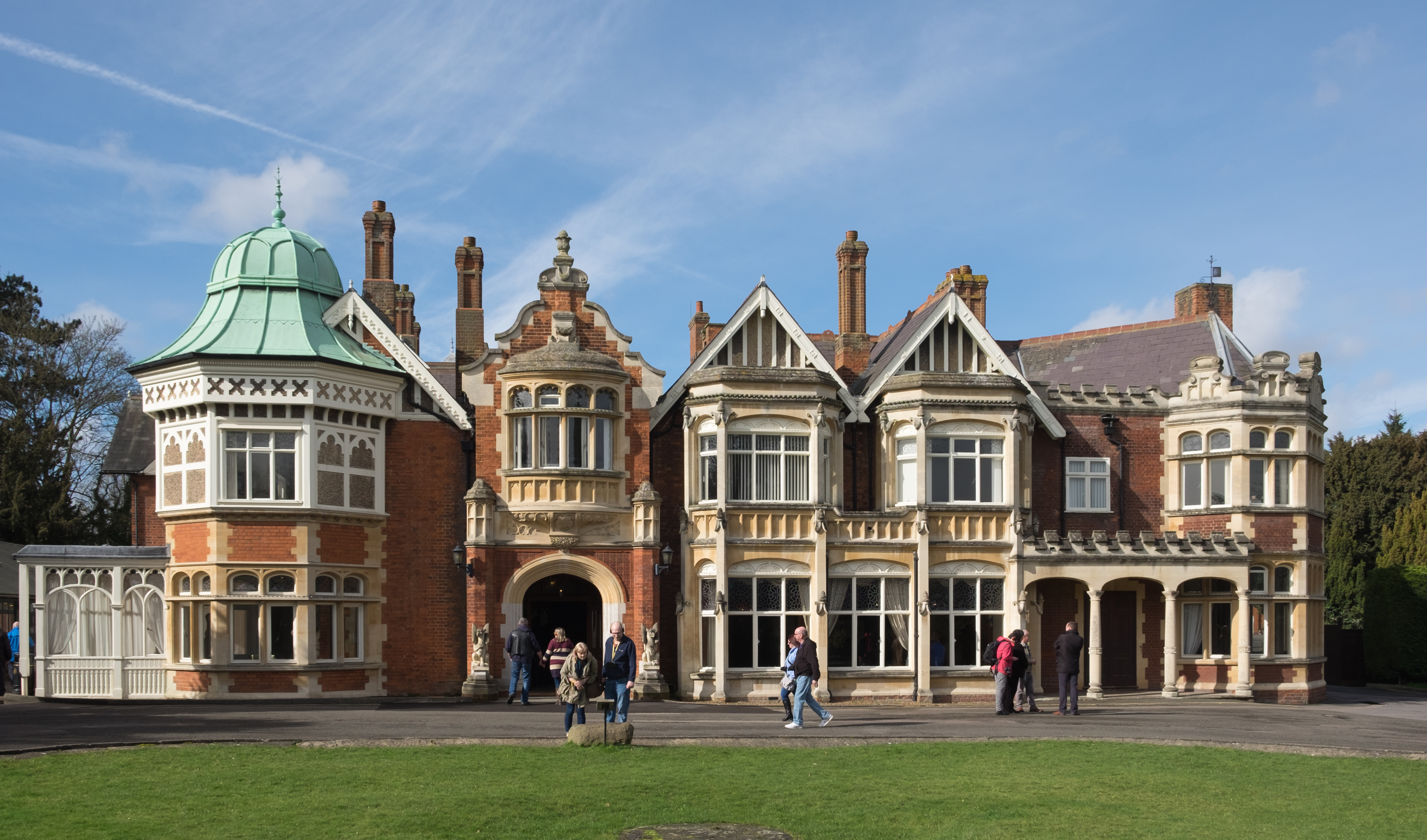
Bletchley Park Mansion

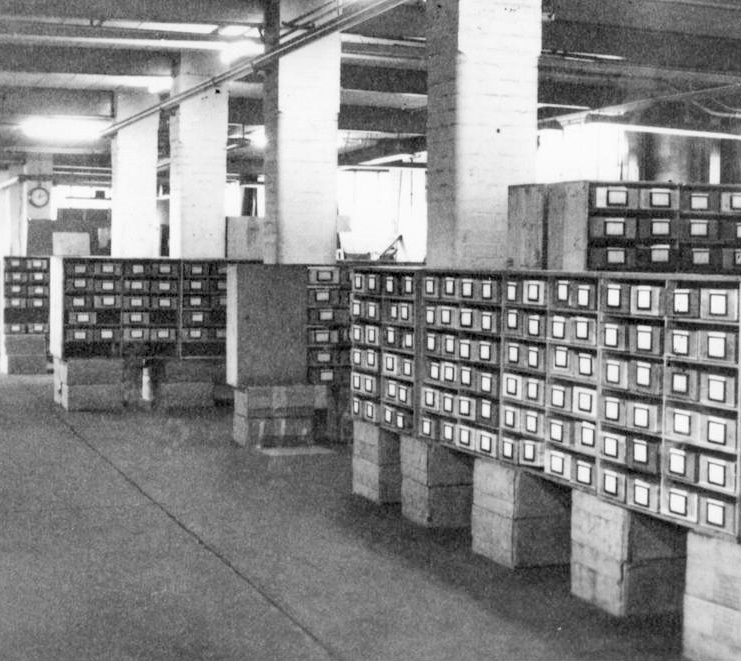
Rows of cabinets containing 5in x 9in index cards at Bletchley Park.

Caroline Chojecki (née Rowett; 11 November 1920 - 24 September 2017) was a naval intelligence analyst at Bletchley Park during World War II.

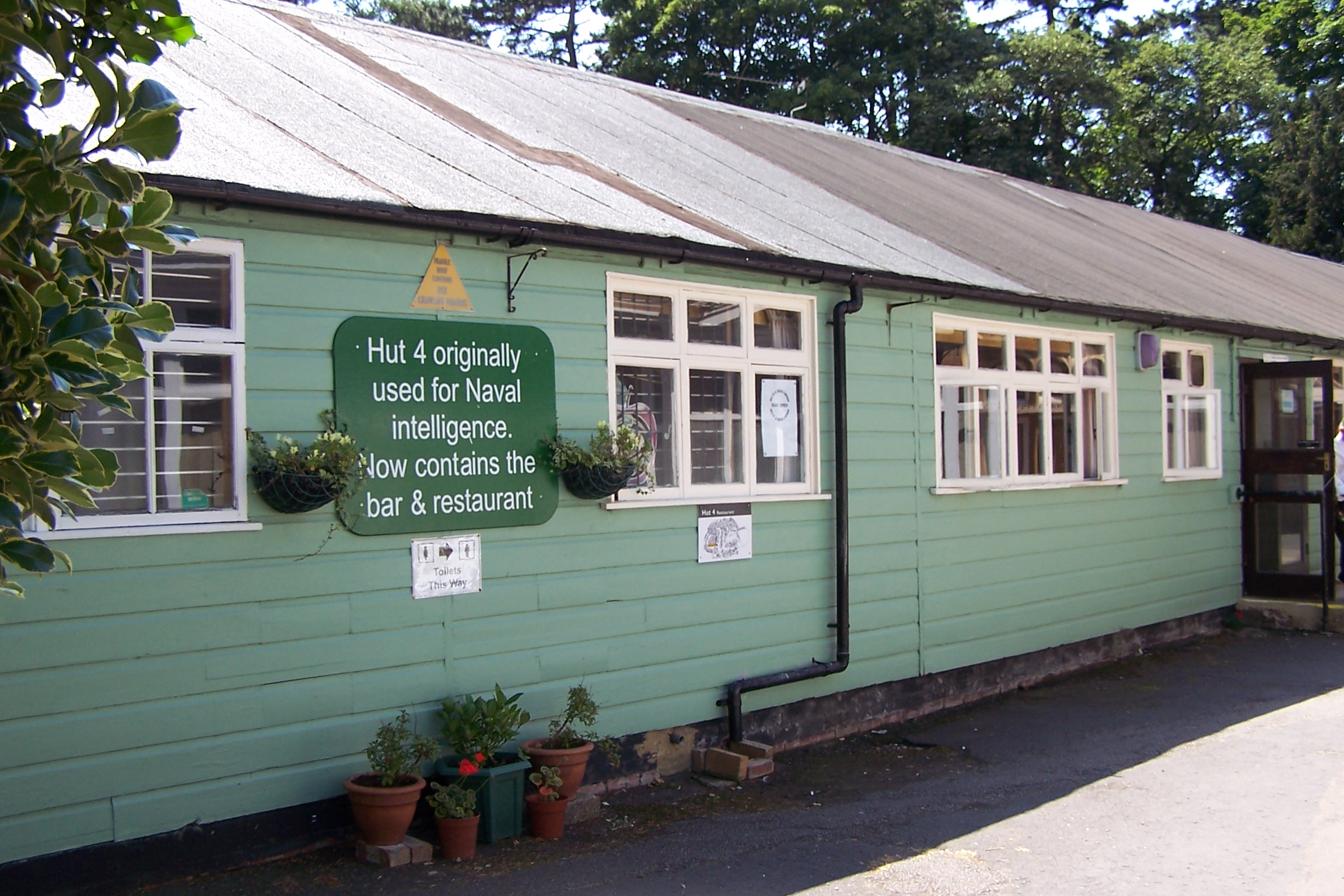
Hut 4, sited adjacent to the mansion, was used during wartime for naval intelligence.

== Early life and education ==
Caroline Chojecki was born Caroline Elizabeth Rowett in Bayswater, England in 1920 to John and Helen Rowett. In 1924 John committed suicide after losing £70,000 sponsoring Sir Ernest Shackleton's last expedition, the Shackleton-Rowett Expedition, to the Antarctic during which Shackleton died.

Caroline graduated from the University of Cambridge in 1942 (specialising in German, French, and Italian languages) and was recruited to Bletchley Park by Frank Birch, Head of the (German) Naval Section.

== Bletchley Park ==
At Bletchley she led a team of seven women in Hut 4 who carried out a detailed analysis of German U-boat operations. With that information she created a database of index cards which was later copied by the Admiralty in London. The database and her extensive knowledge enabled the Admiralty to divert supply convoys from attack by U-boat wolfpacks and played an important role in the allied victory in the Battle of the Atlantic. She remained at Bletchley until 1946.

== Soviet Studies Research Centre ==
In the early 1970s Caroline began creating an index card database similar to the one she created at Bletchley (she later transferred it to a computer database). Her database was credited with "helping the SSRC become an influential force in the assessment of the Soviet threat."

== Personal life ==
Caroline met Zygmunt Chojecki, a Polish exile, in Cambridge after the war. They married in 1953 and had two daughters and one son. After Zygmunt died in 1983 Caroline continued her work until she retired in 1992.

Atlas, a short film inspired by Chojecki's wartime experiences and written and directed by her grandson, Freddie Green, was released in 2024.

== Awards ==
Caroline was appointed a Member of the Order of the British Empire (MBE) in 1986.

== See also ==
- Women in Bletchley Park
- List of women in Bletchley Park
