= Jean Briggs Watters =

WWII codebreaker

- Born: Jean Annette Watters; 15 October 1925; Bury St Edmunds, Suffolk, England
- Died: 15 September 2018 (aged 92); Omaha, Nebraska, United States
- Occupation: Cryptanlyst

Jean Annette Watters (née Briggs; 15 October 1925 – 15 September 2018) was an English cryptanalyst. During World War II, she was a member of the Women's Royal Naval Service and one of around ten thousand women enlisted to decrypt the German Enigma machine code at Bletchley Park. She never revealed details of her work.

== Biography ==
Jean Briggs Watters was born in Bury St Edmunds in Suffolk, England on 15 October 1925, the eldest of three sisters. She attended art school in Cambridge before deferring her studies to join the Women's Royal Naval Service. She was one of some ten thousand women assigned to the top-classified Ultra programme that the British Government instituted at Bletchley Park in Buckinghamshire in order to decrypt the German Enigma machine code; she was tasked with operating an electromechanical device known as a bombe. She was instructed to tell anyone who inquired about her occupation that she was a London bus driver. She kept the truth about her contribution to the British war effort secret for the rest of her life.

Briggs married United States Army Air Corps B-17 pilot John Watters at St Mary's Church, Westley soon after Victory in Europe Day. She was released from her service in the Royal Navy in order to begin her new life with her husband. The Watterses had six children. Although the couple moved to the United States in 1969, Watters remained a British subject despite pleas from her husband to take up American citizenship. Watters was principally a homemaker, but she was also an accomplished artist; her work ranged from birthday cards that she created for her children to paintings that were exhibited, although she refused all offers from admirers who asked to purchase her work. She also volunteered as a public school librarian and a tutor, regularly opening her home during the holiday period to help disadvantaged children. Her leisure activities included gardening, contract bridge and mahjong, both of which she played to a high level, and she was an expert cook with a large repertory of recipes that she shared with friends across the world.

In 2009, Watters's work in the Ultra programme was declassified and her work was acknowledged by Gordon Brown, the British Prime Minister. She was awarded a medal for her service. Watters died on 15 September 2018 in Omaha, Nebraska. At the request of her eldest son, Robin Watters, she was buried with full British military honours at the Omaha National Cemetery on 24 September. Her work at Bletchley is featured in an interactive display in the United States Air Force hangar at the Imperial War Museum at Duxford.

== See also ==
- List of women in Bletchley Park
- List of people associated with Bletchley Park
