= Irene Dixon =

Bletchley Park codebreaker (1924–2021)

- Born: Irene Sarah Griffiths; 1 June 1924; Whitechapel
- Died: 1 January 2021 (aged 96)
- Other names: Rene Griffiths
- Occupation: Codebreaker
- Known for: role at Bletchley Park decoding signals in World War II

Irene Sarah Dixon (1 June 1924 – 1 January 2021), Bletchley Park codebreaker was born in East London and in 1943 was one of the first women sent to the top secret unit decoding signals from Hitler's high command, during World War II, and maintaining secrecy about their work for decades after.

== Biography ==
Irene Dixon was born Irene Sarah Griffiths, in Whitechapel, London to father James Griffiths, employed at the Beckton Gas Works and mother Sarah Griffiths, née Flowerday who was a housewife and secretary of the women's section of the local branch of the Labour Party.

The family moved to East Ham, and she was educated at the Sarah Bonnell Grammar School, Stratford. Her first job after school was in market research at Unilever.

When war broke she was expected to go to Birmingham to work in a munitions factory, but contracted chickenpox, and recovered but was assessed for alternative work and joined the (Wrens) Women's Royal Naval Service. Due to psychometric testing, Dixon was identified as suitable to join (what became almost 10,000 women) in the secret code-breaking service at Bletchley Park, which was also known as HMS Pembroke, in reality the stately home, Woburn Abbey. She was known there as Rene Griffiths.

After the war she returned to work for Unilever, was promoted to manager. In 1951, she married Sidney Harold Dixon, who was a quantity surveyor. They lived in Barking and were actively involved in the local church, and had two children Gillian and Graham; Irene Dixon was remembered for her 'energy, personality and [her] humour charmed everyone.'

== Bletchley Park experience ==
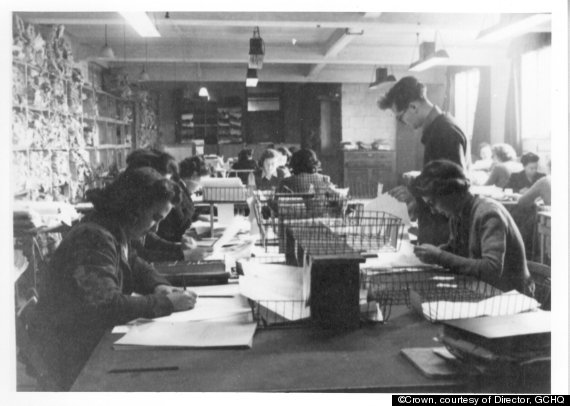
Bletchley Park women at work

Dixon was 'Moua' or mother to nine Wrens in her shared 'cabin' and helped them to bond together. She worked in the Newmanry section on the Lorenz encrypted codes from Hitler's high command, which were decoded with the help of the Colossus MkI computer, created by fellow Eastender, Tommy Flowers. Her particular workteam was directed by Max Newman, and she worked with Jack Good, Donald Michie and Shaun Wylie as they were working on automating the code-breaking. Her name whilst serving shortened to Rene.

Like all the women involved, Dixon kept silent about her role and the important work they did. She attended the 70th anniversary of the Colossus, at the National Museum of Computing, where she met up with her fellow codebreakers, and re-lived their secret and shared experiences.

She is named on the Bletchley Park Role of Honour.

== Death ==
Dixon cared for her husband, Sid, until his death in 2020, and herself died less than a year later.
