= Cicely Mayhew =

British diplomat

The Right Honourable The Lady Mayhew
- Born: Cicely Elizabeth Ludlam; 16 February 1924
- Died: 8 July 2016 (aged 92)
- Occupations: Translator, diplomat
- Known for: First female diplomat for the British Foreign Office
- Spouse: Christopher Mayhew

Cicely Elizabeth Mayhew, Baroness Mayhew (née Ludlam; 16 February 1924 – 8 July 2016) was a British diplomat. She was the second woman to work for the British Foreign Office, and its first female diplomat.

== Early life ==
She was born on 16 February 1924. Her father, G.S Ludlam, was a metallurgist and artisanal miner who made his money in copper in Northern Rhodesia, now Zambia. He mined and produced around 1,523 tonnes of blister copper containing about 70,000 oz. (2,170 kg) of silver in the Mumbwa district. She grew up in Kenya, Tanzania and South Africa. She attended Loreto Convent School, Pretoria from 1929 to 1932. Her formal education was interrupted for two years while she and her mother accompanied her father on prospecting expeditions in Tanzania and Uganda, helping him to pan for gold near Entebbe.

At age 10 she returned to Britain to be educated and did not see her mother again until her twenties. She attended Sheffield High School, living with her aunts. She then won a scholarship to Cheltenham Ladies College, where one of the teachers was a German Jewish refugee; she went on to read French and German at Lady Margaret Hall, Oxford, graduating after only two years in 1944 with a First.

== Career ==
In 1944, near the end of World War II, she was recruited by British naval intelligence and worked at Bletchley Park, in Hut 8, translating decoded German Navy signals. After the war she was appointed as the UK's first woman diplomat. Her first posting as 3rd Secretary at the Foreign Office was to Yugoslavia, and then to Geneva. On her marriage in 1949 she was required to leave the service and her pension was converted to a dowry under rules which the Foreign Office maintained until 1973.

Mayhew created a crucial pathway for women by becoming “the kings first female emissary" in 1947. Mayhew came up against previous barriers during her time spent at Bletchley Park decoding crucial messages, encountering issues which women faced during the wartime, which were hard to overcome. One of the main issues Mayhew encountered was in regards to “being paid significantly lower and being ranked beneath men,” who as Mayhew stated “could not boast a First from Oxford.”

== Personal life ==
In 1949 she married Christopher Mayhew, the politician, broadcaster and writer, whom she met when they were both in the diplomatic service, and they had two sons and two daughters. He died in 1997.

She spent her later years in a care home in Wimbledon, and died on 8 July 2016.

== Legacy ==
In March 2019, the Mayhew Theatre at the Foreign Office's Diplomatic Academy was opened by Prince William, Duke of Cambridge. The theatre was named after Mayhew following a vote amongst Foreign and Commonwealth Office (FCO) staff in which she was the runaway winner.

== Published works ==
- Beads on a String: A Fractured Childhood. Book Guild. 2000. ISBN 978-1-85776-421-5.

== See also ==
- Women in Bletchley Park
- List of women in Bletchley Park
