= Joan McLean =

Joan Louisa McLean
- Born: October 1919; Dublin, Ireland
- Died: 17 January 2018
- Years active: 1942 to 1945
- Known for: Wartime morse code operator

Joan Louisa McLean (October 1919 – 17 January 2018) volunteered and served in the Women's Royal Naval Service (Wrens), and played a pivotal role in codebreaking during World War II. In 1945, as Leading Wren 45270, based in Scarborough, North Yorkshire at HMS Paragon, she provided morse code from German submarines to Bletchley Park, Buckinghamshire.

== Early life ==
Joan Louisa McLean was born 1919, in Dublin, Ireland, one of four children, the daughter of Thomas Trowbridge and Florence Youells. She was raised in Salisbury, Wiltshire, England, and assisted in a dress shop owned by her mother Florence.

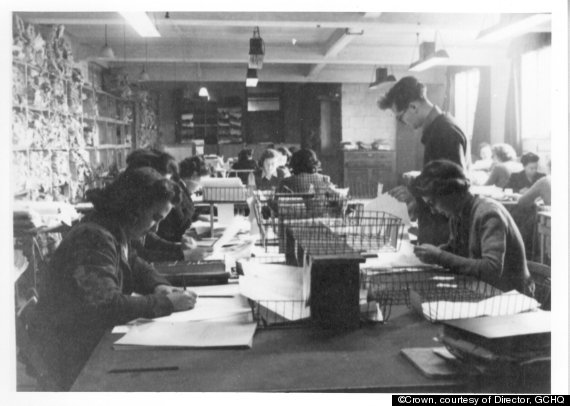
Women in Bletchley Park

In 1940 she met her soon to be husband, Scottish accountant John McLean, from Edinburgh, during a dance held in Salisbury. John was attending a course at the Royal School of Artillery at Larkhill and following their wartime romance and wedding, in 1942 he departed to join the Eighth Army, North African campaign.

== Working for Bletchley Park ==
With one brother joining the Royal Air Force (RAF) and the other in the Merchant Navy, Joan was keen to get involved on the Home front. She volunteered for the Wrens where she earned 3 shillings a week at Scarborough Y Station's (HMS Paragon) onshore listening base. The workers there would work an eight hour day which was a third of the day. During the next two days they would work their eight hour shifts at different times. There was no rest day in the week and if anyone was absent then someone else had to work twice as hard.

In a Bletchley Park Trust interview and letter sent home, Joan told of once receiving detention for arriving back late despite it not being her fault. Her outraged father proceeded to write to the King, George VI complaining that “My daughter is fighting in YOUR war” which only served to make matters worse.

== Post-war life and death ==
Post-war Joan resumed married life in Edinburgh with John, bringing up four children, Iain, Jane, Katrina and Kevin. The nature of her work was only revealed upon Bletchley Park opening to the public in 1993.
