= Ruth Bourne =

British codebreaker (1926–2025)

Ruth June Bourne (née Henry; 2 June 1926 – 17 December 2025) was a British codebreaker. She was one of the "Women of Bletchley Park" who were recruited to help secure victory in World War II against the Axis powers. The women were a secret team, put together by the British government, who were made to sign a Secrets Act confirming that they would not tell anyone about their work there. During her time at Bletchley Park, Bourne's job was not only to work on decrypting the German code system, but also to be a bombe operator. She was one of the Women's Royal Naval Service (WRENs) responsible for dismantling the bombes wire by wire after the war ended in 1945.

== Early life and recruitment ==
Ruth June Henry was born on 2 June 1926. Aged 17 at the time, Bourne was a trainee member of the Women's Royal Naval Service when she was told that she would be joining the women of Bletchley Park. She was offered to sign a contract that tied her into endless hours of work, no social life and no way to exit once she had agreed. Bourne was recruited to be a member of the team at HMS Pembroke V as part of the SDX special duties. Bletchley Park workers consisted of two different teams: the 'y station', the women responsible for picking up the German Enigma code, and the 'x station', those who were responsible for bombe operation, like Bourne herself.

=== Role during World War II ===
The majority of the women recruited had no previous experience of bombe operation and were going in to the job blind sighted. The workers were only shown a few machines for training purposes on recruitment of the job. They were told not to ask any questions. The role itself included "preparing the machines each day, turning the drums on the front and plugging up the boards at the back according to settings laid out in a menu". While Bourne was a checker she would be in charge of waiting for information to come through as "confirmed". When this happened she would then have to make a call to report the stop on the code menu which would be checked by other members of Bletchley.

Bourne's job meant that she was on her feet all day and there was little time for breaks. There was a term 'mustard', that meant the workers at Bletchley Park were told what they were going to do without any discussion or choice of their own. From the very first day of her work as a bombe operator to when her time at Bletchley ended, Bourne did what she was told on demand. Despite the little amount of agency the workers had at Bletchley, she said that it was very satisfying to know that they were helping to break German codes. Her work as a bombe operator began in early 1944 and continued until the end of the war in 1945.

== After the war ==
In 1945 when World War II ended, all of the workers of Bletchley Park were told that they must continue to keep their work there a secret. It was not until 1974, when the book The Ultra Secret was published, that she, along with other Bletchley Park workers, were able to tell their families about their involvement in bringing down Nazi Germany. Bourne described what it was like when the news finally broke, saying that "you got so used to not talking to anyone" that even after they were allowed to disclose their roles she still would not talk about her experience in depth.

Bourne died on 17 December 2025, at the age of 99.
