= Irene Brown =

British codebreaker

Irene Jessie Brown
- Born: Irene Jessie Young; 16 February 1919
- Died: 7 June 2017 (aged 98); Edinburgh, Scotland
- Known for: Bletchley Park codebreaker
- Spouses: Leslie Cairns (m. 1943); Reginald Brown (m. 1948)
- Children: Iain Gordon Brown

Irene Jessie "Mouse" Brown (née Young; 16 February 1919 – 7 June 2017) was an author and codebreaker who worked at Bletchley Park in Buckinghamshire in Hut 6 during the Second World War. She was employed as a linguist and translator working in the Registration Room and the main Decoding Room.

== Early life ==
Irene Young grew up and attended school in Edinburgh (St. Margaret's Convent School, Canaan Park School and Esdaile College). She was interested in French, English literature and Latin. At University of Edinburgh she read English Language and Literature.

== Bletchley Park ==
She began working at Bletchley Park in the Government Code and Cypher School in 1942. Brown wrote a book (in her maiden name) about her time at Bletchley, Enigma Variations: a Memoir of Love and War. Published in 1990, it was one of the first books to describe what life was like at Bletchley. Women formed roughly 75% of the workforce at Bletchley Park. The book tells of her time in Hut 6, everyday life at "Station X", her wartime experiences in general and the tragic death of her first husband (Leslie Cairn). Irene and Leslie both worked in confidential roles. He in the Special Air Service (SAS), she as a codebreaker. Neither could tell the other much about what they were doing. In 1944, he became missing in action in occupied France.

== Later life ==
She married Reginald Sydney Brown in 1948. They returned to Edinburgh and she worked in a departmental library at Edinburgh University. Her papers and correspondence are held there. She lived much of her life in Edinburgh and died in 2017 at the age of 98.
