= HMS Paragon =

Three ships of the Royal Navy have been named HMS Paragon:

- Paragon was a 42-gun ship launched in 1633 as Henrietta Maria. She was renamed Paragon in 1650 and was burnt at sea in 1655.
- HMS Paragon 1803, a hired armed ship, hired circa 30 Dec 1803, and returned to owners circa 14 Apr 1805. ADM 51/403 Captains' logs 1803 Dec 30-1805 Apr 14 held by National Archives.
- HMS Paragon (1913) was an Acasta-class destroyer launched in 1913 and sunk in 1917.

Stockton Communication Training Centre commissioned HMS Paragon 7 October 1984
