= Clara Grace Thornton =

British diplomat and translator (1913–1987)

Clara Grace Thornton CBE MVO (1913–1987) was a British diplomat, an academic, a translator and a code-breaker at Bletchley Park. She ended her career as Secretary of the Women's National Commission, the official advisory body founded in 1969 to ensure that UK Government policy took account of women in matters of public interest.

== Early life and education ==
She was born on 27 June 1913; her father was a jeweller and silversmith and an alderman. Her secondary education was at Kettering High School.

She studied at Newnham College, Cambridge, matriculating in 1932. At the time, women could not receive full degrees from the University of Cambridge.

She took Part I English Tripos, and then the Archaeology and Anthropology Tripos (B), receiving a 1st class mark in her exams.

She received a number of scholarships from Cambridge to fund graduate studies before becoming the University Scandinavian Student from 1936 to 1938, working at the University of Copenhagen and the Reykjavik University. She was awarded her PhD in early Icelandic studies in 1938.

== Career ==
For most of the war Thornton worked in the Ministry of Information, including work with the code-breakers at Bletchley Park.

In 1945, aged 31, she went to the British Embassy in Copenhagen as press attache, a post for which her knowledge of Scandinavian languages and culture were crucial. She was awarded the Danish Freedom Medal in 1945. In 1948, she moved to Reykjavik with the post of vice-consul (taking over the job of chargé d'affaires in 1949 and 1951).

She was the fourth woman to be given diplomatic rank in the British Foreign Service.

Her obituary in The Times notes "At that time it was the most responsible British diplomatic job of its kind which had ever been undertaken by a woman, and was regarded as the first important step to becoming an ambassador. Thereafter, Grace Thornton's diplomatic career was nothing other than distinguished. and it is to the Diplomatic Service's discredit (and the nation's loss) that she appeared never to have been offered an embassy."

She was first secretary and consul in Copenhagen, 1954 to 1960, where in 1957 she was awarded an MVO, and 1959, an OBE. She was 1st Secretary at Brussels, 1960–62, where she handled information matters.

In 1962, she took up a post as consul in Djakarta, becoming consul general in 1963. The Times obituary reports "In the tense autumn of 1963 with civil unrest widespread, she called for the immediate evacuation of 166 civilians, British nationals among them, trapped at the Shell oilfields at Balakpapan in east Borneo. She flew to the area bearing a letter from the Indonesian Government; and on her arrival was authorized by the British ambassador. Andrew Gilchrist, to take whatever steps she felt necessary to effect a successful evacuation. She organized their flight to Djakarta from where they were taken by the RAF to Singapore. When she alighted at Singapore airport, she modestly disclaimed all praise for the enterprise." She was awarded the CBE the following year.

Her final overseas posting was in Lisbon, 1965–70, as Consul General.

She published edited translations of Hans Christian Andersen's travel writings, alongside various scholarly papers.

Upon leaving the Diplomatic Service, Thornton took up the post of Secretary of the Women's National Commission, a post she held from 1973 to 1978, including during International Women's Year, 1975. This was the official advisory body founded in 1969 to ensure that UK Government policy took account of women in matters of public interest. The Times obituary notes that "Its scope had hitherto been confined to national issues, but its new secretary was keen to widen its horizons." Others were concerned that, as a long-time member of the Diplomatic Service, she was too much of an insider to challenge the Establishment.

In her obituary in The Times, she was described as follows: "Grace Thornton was an unflappable and splendidly outspoken woman. To look at her she seemed fiercely formidable ('my housekeeper calls it my frightening the horses look.'). Convinced as she was of her own abilities, she had no time for 'liberated' females in search of 'an identity', explaining that she did not have to fight male opposition in the Foreign Office - 'they soon learned we didn't lose the keys or get seduced by South Americans'."

She was described by her colleagues at Newnham College as having "a robust practicality that brooked no feebleness. Yet her exacting standards were tempered by a great kindliness and sympathy and by an enormous sense of fun.... Incisive in Committee, witty in conversation, she is remembered above all for her generous involvement and the warmth of her personality."
