= Ione Roseveare =

British World War II administrator at Bletchley Park

Ione Roseveare (née Katherine Ione Jay) (9 November 1920, Weobley – 24 September 2010, Uppingham) was a Temporary Junior Administrative Officer at Hut 6, Bletchley Park. She met her husband Bob Roseveare while working there.

Ione was studying for licentiate of the Royal Academy of Music in Bristol in 1941. However she was evacuated to Wells, Somerset. Here she was interviewed by Gordon Welchman, who was recruiting for Bletchley Park.

In 2005 she contributed a chapter "Memories of Bletchley Park 1941-5" to a local history volume in Uppingham, Rutland, UK.
