= Violet Cane =

English mathematician

Violet Rosina Cane
- Born: 31 January 1916
- Died: 27 June 2008 (aged 92)
- Education: Cambridge University
- Scientific career
- Fields: Mathematics, Statistics
- Workplaces: University of Manchester

Violet Rosina Cane (31 January 1916 – 27 June 2008) was a Cambridge-educated statistician who was the first woman appointed as a professor in the Faculty of Science at the University of Manchester. She is known for her work in classical statistics and stochastic processes.

== Biography ==
Cane was born in Camberwell, London, the daughter of Tubal George Cane and Anne Louisa (Lansdell) Cane.

- 1938: Graduated from Newnham College
- 1942-45: Joined the Foreign Office and worked at Bletchley Park
- 1947: Elected Fellow of the Royal Statistical Society
- 1948: Awarded a diploma in mathematical statistics from Cambridge, and appointed statistician to the MRC Applied Psychology Unit at Cambridge.
- 1957: Elected Fellow of Newnham College
- 1959: Founding member of the Experimental Psychology Society
- 1960: Appointed University Lecturer in the Statistical Laboratory at Cambridge.
- 1971: Appointed Professor of Mathematical Statistics at University of Manchester

She retired from Manchester in 1981. She has been described as "one of the biggest names in the subject [of mathematics]" at Manchester in the 20th century.

== Selected publications ==
- 1959. "Behaviour Sequences as Semi-Markov Chains," Journal of the Royal Statistical Society Series B
