= Elisabeth Hardy =

Bletchley Park decoder

Elisabeth Hardy (born Elisabeth Mary Stewart; August 3, 1923 – July 21, 2016) was a translator at Bletchley Park during the Second World War. She later provided translation and expertise for the Nuremberg Trials.

== Background ==
Elisabeth Hardy studied Modern Languages at Glasgow University. From 1942 to 1945, as an expert in German, she worked at Bletchley Park as a member of the Hut 3, translating the military intelligence in the decrypted Nazi and Luftwaffe messages.

From 1945 to 1948 Hardy served as an expert during the Nuremberg trials, providing information on Nazi chain of command and German translation.

During the Nuremberg trials she met and married Alexander G. Hardy, a senior U.S. prosecutor on the Medical Case. After this she moved to the United States.
