= Marion Paton =

Accountant and codebreaker (1923–2016)

- Marion Paton in the early 1950s with husband and child
- Born: Mary Hendry; 1923; Aldborough, North Riding of Yorkshire, England
- Died: December 2016 (aged 93); York, England
- Occupation: codebreaker
- Years active: 1944–1945
- Employer: Foreign Office
- Spouse: James Paton

Marion Paton (1923 – December 2016) was a British accountant and code breaker at Bletchley Park during World War II.

== Biography ==
Marion was born in Aldborough, North Riding of Yorkshire and, at age 13, moved to York to attend the Mill Mount Grammar School. Aged 18, after recently starting a job at an accountants firm in York, she was called up by the Foreign Office as a Foreign Office Civilian to Bletchley Park to aid the war effort. She was selected because she had achieved one of the highest national scores in her maths exam. From July 1944 to April 1945 she served in Block B, working on Naval decoding. For her service, she is listed in the Roll of Honour at Bletchley Park and commemorated on the Codebreakers Wall.

Marion had left Bletchley earlier to return home to nurse her sick mother, who was dying of tuberculosis. Having signed the Official Secrets Act, she never told her family details of her work during the war.

After the war she returned to accounting. In 1948, she married James Paton, an RAF navigator.
