= Joan Joslin =

Codebreaker at Bletchley Park (1923–2020)

Joan Winifred Joslin (née Glover, 11 March 1923 – 8 February 2020) was an English codebreaker at Bletchley Park during World War II.

== Early life ==
Joslin was born as Joan Glover on 11 March 1923 in Staffordshire, England.

== Career ==
Joslin was ordered to Bletchley Park on 24 December 1941. During her initial interview, she took tests and completed puzzles, and told the recruiters about her love of mathematics and English. After six weeks learning to use Hollerith machines for code-breaking, Joslin worked in Block C during the war to decrypt messages from Japanese airplanes and German ships. Her work helped locate and sink the German battleship Scharnhorst.

A few days before Victory in Europe Day, Joslin has said that "were on night duty and we had a message through that the German troops in Italy had capitulated and we realised that the war in Europe had ended. We were given 48 hours leave after we got the news." They had to keep the news secret.

Joslin's cryptography work remained a secret until the mid-1970s. Her parents, her father-in-law and mother-in-law all died before they were allowed to know of Joslin's war work.

Joslin was interviewed as part of the Bletchley Park Oral History Project in May 2014 and attended the reopening of the restored Bletchley Park centre by Catherine, Princess of Wales (then Duchess of Cambridge) in June 2014. She also gave talks at local schools about her role during the war.

== Personal life ==
Joslin met her husband Kenneth Joslin on her first day of work at in Bletchley Park and they became engaged three years later, in 1944. They married on 9 August 1945 in Rugby, Warwickshire, and were on honeymoon in Dover when the war in Japan ended. They lived in the village of Stock, Essex.

== Death ==
Joslin died in Essex on 8 February 2020, at the age of 96. She is commemorated on the Bletchley Park "CodeBreakers Wall."
