= Gwen Hollington =

Bletchley Park translator

- Born: Eleanor Gwendoline Paxton; 1 February 1919
- Died: 12 June 2014 (aged 95)
- Education: Roedean School; Girton College, Cambridge; University of Freiburg
- Occupation: Civilian translator
- Years active: 1941–1945
- Organization(s): Government Code and Cypher School, Bletchley Park
- Spouse: Barrie Hollington

Eleanor Gwendoline Hollington, née Paxton (1 February 1919 – 12 June 2014), was a Cambridge graduate in Modern and Medieval Languages who worked as a civilian translator for the Government Code and Cypher School at Bletchley Park from 1941 to 1945.

== Biography ==
Born on 1 February 1919, Gwen Paxton won a scholarship to Roedean School and went on to study French and German at Girton College, Cambridge. During her studies, she spent a year at the University of Freiburg to improve her German. At Cambridge, she earned blues in lacrosse and lawn tennis.

In an interview in 2011, she stated: "Before the war I had lived in Germany for a year studying at Freiburg as part of my degree and I made a lot of friends. A lot of the Germans I knew were charming, so it was difficult to think of them as the enemy."

Upon graduation, she was recruited to work as a civilian translator at Hut 4, Bletchley Park, translating decrypted German naval communications into English. She worked there for four years, while billeted with a family in Woburn Sands.

After the war, she worked for a publishing company as a literary assistant. She married Barrie Hollington (died 1964), with whom she had five children. She died on 12 June 2014.
