= Rosemary Brown Stanton =

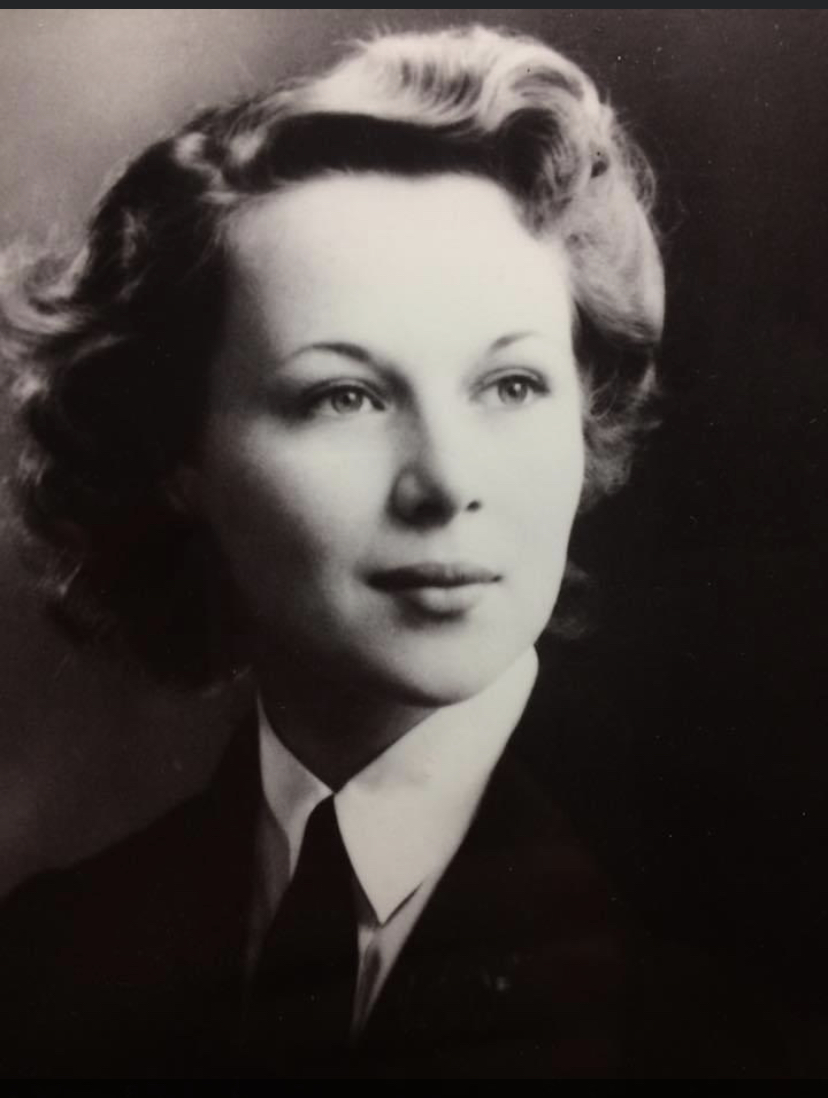

Rosemary Ruth Ellman-Brown Stanton (3 February 1924 – 21 January 2017) worked in the decoding room at Bletchley Park in World War II, and led an "extraordinary life".

== Early life ==
Stanton was born on 3 February 1924, in Radlett, a town between St. Albans and Borehamwood in Hertfordshire, the daughter of Reginald and Janet Brown (née Anderson).

== Women of Bletchley Park ==
Brown first served in the British Navy in her younger years, and then later joined in working with the British codebreakers at Bletchley Park during the Second World War. She was based in Block D(6), the decoding room.

== Personal life ==
Rosemary Brown Stanton met her future husband, an American serviceman, Frank "Fran" H. Stanton (died 1989), whilst working at Bletchley Park, and they married in 1945. They had five children, and lived in Franklin, Tennessee, US.

Brown Stanton died at the age of 92 on 21 January 2017.

She was survived by her sibling Michael Ellman-Brown, as well as by her children: Victoria, John, Robert, David and Rebecca, 26 grandchildren and great-grandchildren.
