= Sigrid Augusta Green =

British code breaker

- Born: 3 December 1920; Darwen, Lancashire, England
- Died: 12 October 2012 (aged 91)
- Occupations: Codebreaker, Resistance

Sigrid Augusta Green (3 December 1920 – 12 October 2012) gathered intelligence in preparation for the sabotage of the Telemark plant during the Second World War. She worked for the Norwegian Resistance and then as a code breaker at Bletchley Park.

== Life and work ==
Sigrid Augusta Green, known as Gusta, was born in Darwen, Lancashire, to a Norwegian mother and a British father. Her mother had moved to the UK to work as an au pair and married.

Green joined the Women's Auxiliary Air Force at the age of 22, on 10 December 1942. Her bilingual ability from her Norwegian mother (Edith Stafford Green) was quickly recognised and she was transferred to the Norwegian Resistance. She was sent secretly to Nazi-occupied Norway to research the heavy water factory at Telemark owned by Sigrid’s uncle, which was being used to produce heavy water to further the Nazis’ nuclear ambitions. Green had visited the plant before the war started, and she remembered how to find it. Because she refused to parachute into the country, she was secretly landed in Norway by submarine. While on board, she dressed as a man because women were not allowed on submarines.

After completing her assignment, she escaped from Norway to neutral Sweden and then to the United Kingdom by hiding in the empty bomb compartment of a British-made Mosquito airplane. The 1943 mission by Norwegian commandos to destroy the Telemark plant was successful and became the subject of a popular film in 1965 titled The Heroes of Telemark.

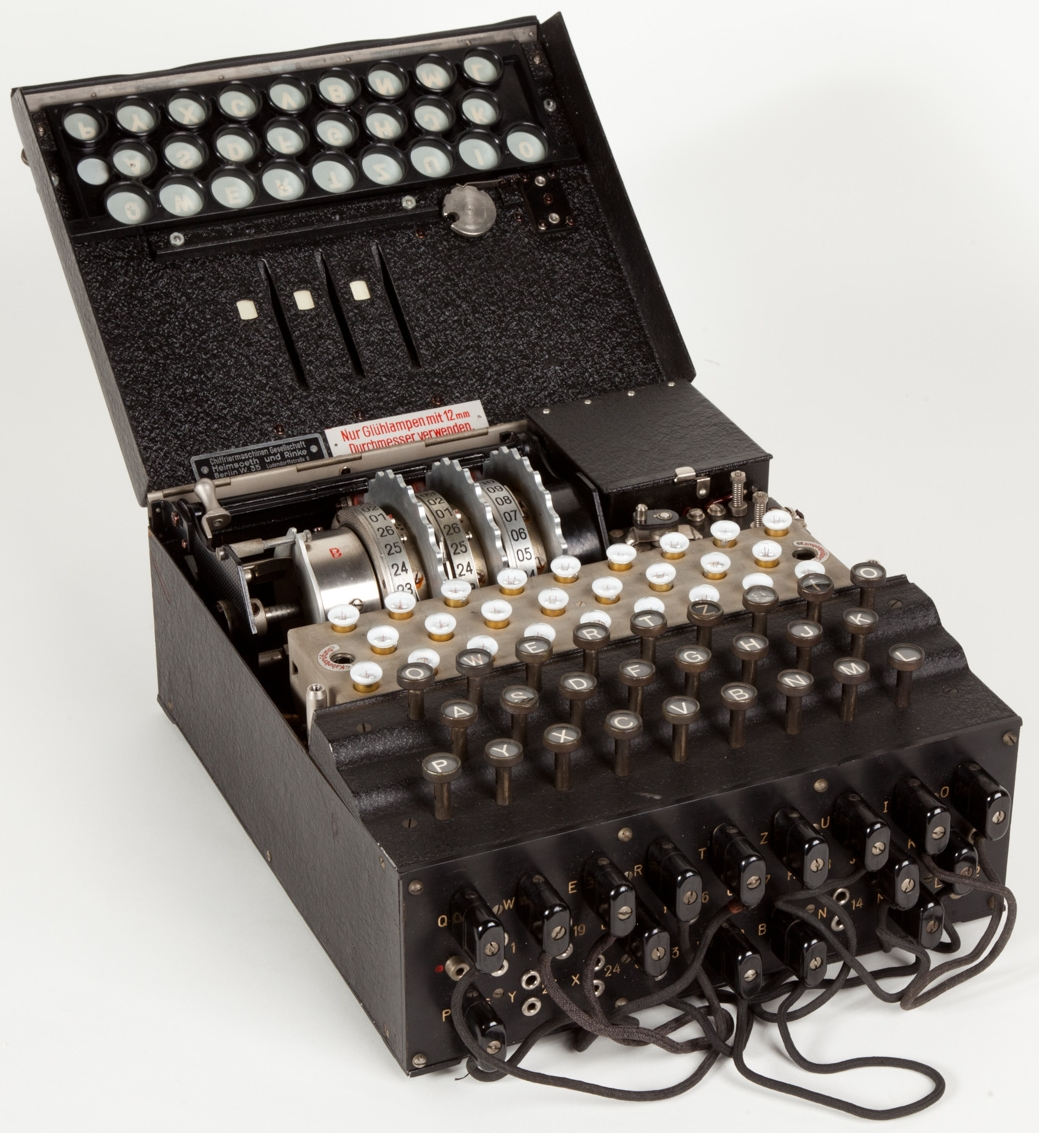
The Enigma encrypting and decrypting machine used by Nazi cryptographers.

When Green returned home to the United Kingdom, she was assigned to join the secret code breakers at Bletchley Park (Buckinghamshire), where German codes, that had been created by using Enigma machines, were decoded.

She kept her activities as a war-time code breaker secret from everyone, including her family, until the year before she died.

Green remained unmarried. She had been engaged to a fighter pilot but he was killed in action during the war.

== Accolades ==
- Received Bletchley Park Badge
- Awarded the Freedom of Bletchley Park honour
