= Women in Bletchley Park =

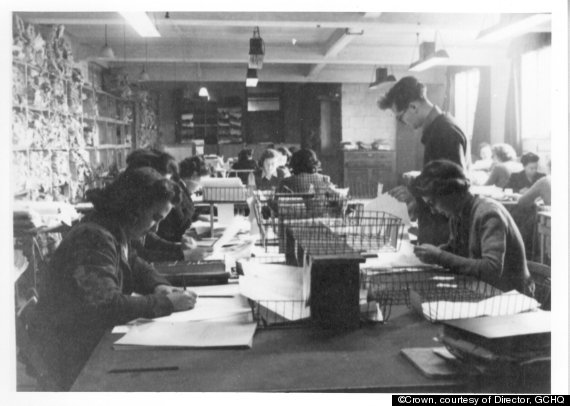
- Women working at Bletchley Park, date unknown

About 7,500 women worked in Bletchley Park, the central site for British cryptanalysts during World War II. Women constituted roughly 75% of the workforce there. While women were overwhelmingly under-represented in high-level work such as cryptanalysis, they were employed in large numbers in other important areas, including as operators of cryptographic and communications machinery, translators of Axis documents, traffic analysts, clerical workers, and more. Most of the female workforce were enlisted in the Women's Royal Naval Service, WRNS, nicknamed the Wrens.

The Wrens performed a vital role operating the computers used for code-breaking, including the Colossus and Bombe machines. Working around the clock in three eight-hour shifts, they were the beating heart of Bletchley Park.

Women were also involved in the construction of the machines, including doing the wiring and soldering to create each Colossus computer.

== Background ==
Bletchley Park was the central site for British cryptanalysis during World War II. It housed the Government Code and Cypher School (GC&CS), which frequently penetrated the secret communications of the Axis powers – most importantly the German Enigma and Lorenz ciphers. According to Sir Harry Hinsley, the "Ultra" intelligence produced at Bletchley Park shortened the war by approximately two years. Bletchley Park is famous for the impact it had on the war and for the work performed there by scholars such as Alan Turing and Dilly Knox. This work, though secret until 1974, had a significant impact on the history of science and technology – in particular, the history of technology. In the past century, archivists and historians have increasingly emphasized the role of the women who worked in Bletchley Park.

== Recruitment of women ==
In 1937, when the tensions in Europe and Asia were becoming apparent, the Chief of MI6, Admiral Hugh Sinclair, ordered GC&CS to begin preparing for a war-footing and to expand its staff numbers. These were to be "men of the professor type", primarily drawn from Oxford and, in particular, Cambridge universities. However, as the cryptanalytic work became increasingly mechanized, many more staff were needed.

Women were first brought into Bletchley Park after being approached at university or because of trusted family connections; debutantes especially were prized, as they were considered the most trustworthy due to their upper class backgrounds. These "debs" performed mostly administrative and clerical work. However, the personnel needs of Bletchley Park continued to grow. The heads of Bletchley Park next looked for women who were linguists, mathematicians, and even crossword experts. The ability to do crosswords was explored in the interview of Jean Argles a codebreaker employed outside Bletchley Park. In 1942 the Daily Telegraph hosted a competition where a cryptic crossword was to be solved within 12 minutes. Winners were approached by the military and some were recruited to work at Bletchley Park, as these individuals were thought to have strong lateral thinking skills, important for codebreaking. The majority of these women came from middle-class backgrounds and some held degrees in mathematics, physics and engineering; they were given entry into STEM programs due to the lack of men, who had been sent to war.

By the end of 1944 in excess of 2,500 women were employed by GC&CS from the Women's Royal Naval Service (whose members were called "Wrens"); over 1,500 women were assigned from the Women's Auxiliary Air Force ("WAAFs") and approximately 400 came from the Auxiliary Territorial Service. Six out of ten women working in Bletchley Park were serving in the British Armed Forces. Many of those women were more interested in working on planes and ships, and never expected to work in a place such as Bletchley Park.

Women held numerous roles at Bletchley Park, ranging from administrators, index card compilers and dispatch riders, to a very few as code-breaking specialists. Initially many of the men in charge were skeptical that women would be able to operate the Bombe machines and the Colossus computers; in one section which employed women, including college graduates, the male section head opined that "women wouldn't like to do any intellectual work". Gordon Preston persuaded Max Newman (who thought that the women would not care for the "intellectual effort") to authorise talks to the Wrens to explain their work mathematically, and the talks were very popular. Women in Bletchley Park soon proved themselves to be up to the task, as they performed good work in any position they held at Bletchley Park.

Though the initial focus of recruitment, particularly during the latter years of the inter-war period, focused primarily on male academics, there soon emerged an eclectic staff of "Boffins and Debs", which caused GC&CS to be whimsically dubbed the "Golf, Cheese and Chess Society". At the outbreak of the war Dilly Knox was the GC&CS's chief cryptanalyst and, as such, took a leading role in the work on the various Enigma networks. His team, which he staffed with women ("Dilly's girls"), included Margaret Rock and Mavis Lever, sometimes termed "Dilly's Fillies". During a September 1941 morale-boosting visit, Winston Churchill reportedly remarked to head of GC&CS Alastair Denniston: "I told you to leave no stone unturned to get staff, but I had no idea you had taken me so literally."

Women in World War II worked in many places that previously had been largely confined to men, such as industry and the military. Bletchley Park was unusual because the women there worked on demanding intellectual tasks. One of the few directly comparable scenarios during the conflict was that American women were recruited to perform artillery ballistics calculations and to program computers. These women "computers" used a differential analyzer in the basement of the Moore School of Electrical Engineering to speed up their calculations, though the machine required a mechanic to be totally accurate and the women often rechecked the calculations by hand.

== Selected women ==
Women in Bletchley Park
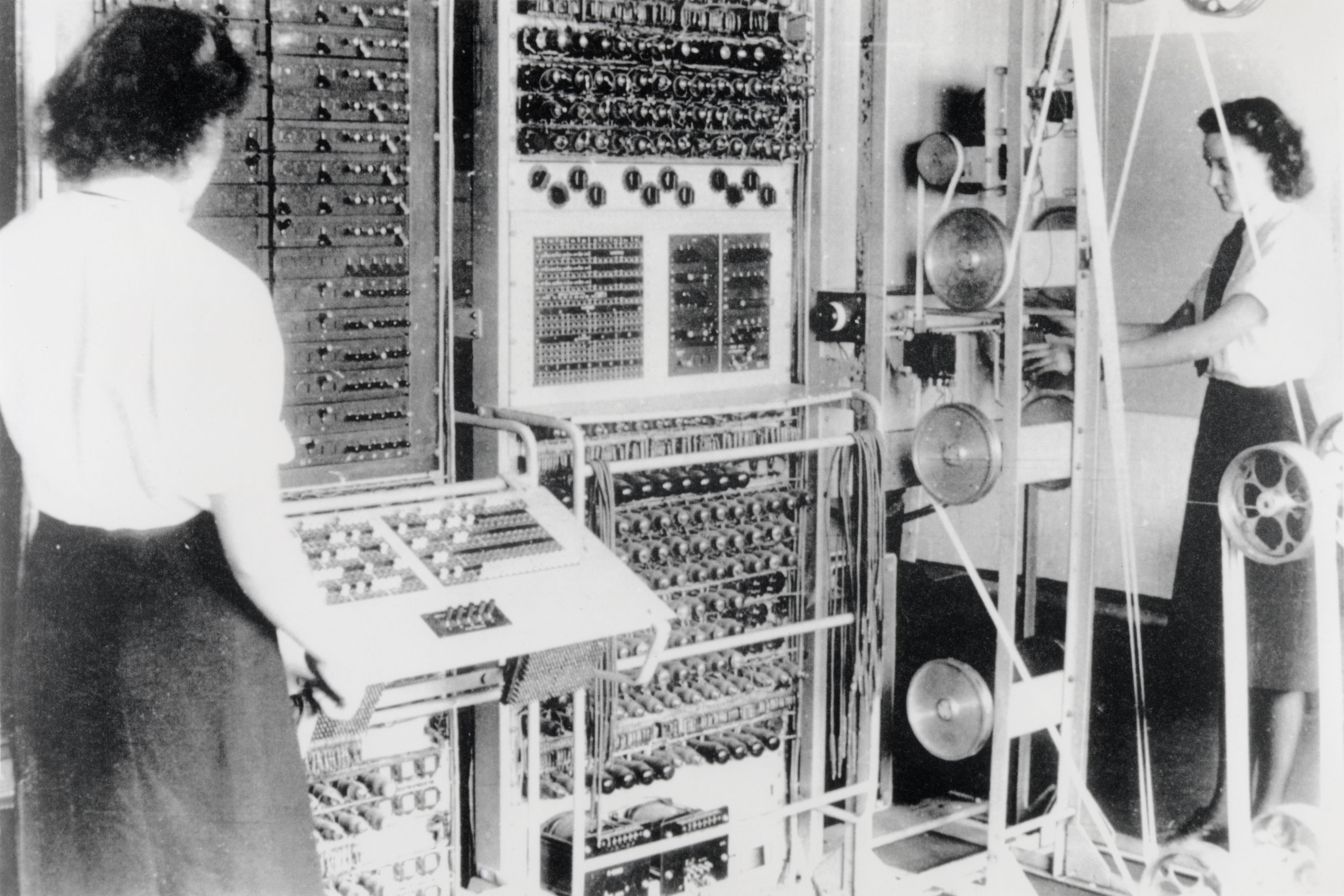
- A Colossus Mark 2 computer being operated by Dorothy Du Boisson (left) and Elsie Booker
- Related: Colossus computer

This section tells the stories of a few selected women who worked in Bletchley Park.

=== Mavis Batey ===
Mavis Lilian Batey (née Lever) was born on 5 May 1921 in Dulwich to her seamstress mother and postal worker father. She was brought up in Norbury and went to Coloma Convent Girls' School in Croydon. She was studying German at University College London at the outbreak of World War II, concentrating on the German romantics in particular.

Initially employed to check the personal columns of The Times for coded spy messages, in 1940 she was recruited to work as a codebreaker at Bletchley Park. She worked as an assistant to Dilly Knox, and was closely involved in the decryption effort before the Battle of Matapan. According to The Daily Telegraph, she became so familiar with the styles of individual enemy operators that she could determine that two of them had a girlfriend called Rosa and this insight allowed her to develop a successful technique.

In December 1941, she broke a message between Belgrade and Berlin that enabled Dilly Knox's team to work out the wiring of the Abwehr Enigma, an Enigma machine previously thought to be unbreakable. While at Bletchley Park, she met Keith Batey, a mathematician and fellow codebreaker whom she married in 1942.

=== Jane Fawcett ===
Jane Fawcett (née Hughes) was assigned to Hut 6, a "Decoding Room" of women only. The conditions were poor—dimly lit, poorly heated, and poorly ventilated—and the women worked long hours under extreme pressure. In Hut 6, Jane would receive the daily Enigma keys and type them into their own Typex machines. They would then determine if the messages were recognizable German.

On 25 May 1941, Hughes and several other women were briefed on the search for the German battleship Bismarck. Shortly thereafter, she decoded a message referring to the Bismarck that detailed its current position and destination in France. The Bismarck was subsequently attacked by the Royal Navy and sunk on 27 May. This was the first significant victory by the codebreakers, demonstrating the utility of the project.

Her work did not come to light until decades later, during the 1990s, as it had been classified under Britain's Official Secrets Act of 1939. Compared with the publicly acknowledged heroics of the navy, Fawcett said "we felt slightly ashamed of having only done Bletchley, like also-rans. So when everything we had done, which we knew had been very hard work and incredibly demanding, suddenly showed its head and we were being asked to talk about it, it felt quite overwhelming. I'd never told a soul, not even my husband. My grandchildren were very surprised."

=== Jean Valentine ===
Jean Valentine was an operator of the bombe decryption device in Hut 11 at Bletchley Park in England, designed by Alan Turing and others during World War II. She was a member of the "Wrens" (Women's Royal Naval Service, WRNS). During this time, she lived in Steeple Claydon in Buckinghamshire. She started working on 15 shillings (75 pence) a week. Along with her co-workers, she remained quiet about her war work until the mid-1970s.

More recently, Jean Valentine had been involved with the reconstruction of the bombe at Bletchley Park Museum, completed in 2006. In 2006, she said: "Unless people come pouring through the doors, a vital piece of history is lost. The more we can educate them, the better." She demonstrates the reconstructed bombe at the Bletchley Park Museum and also leads tours there. She participated in a major reunion at Bletchley Park in 2009.

On 24 June 2012, Jean Valentine spoke on her wartime experiences at Bletchley Park and elsewhere as part of a Turing's Worlds event to celebrate the centenary of the birth of Alan Turing, organized by the Department for Continuing Education's Rewley House at Oxford University in cooperation with the British Society for the History of Mathematics (BSHM).

=== Joan Clarke ===
Joan Elisabeth Lowther Murray (née Clarke) was a cryptanalyst and numismatist. Though she did not personally seek the spotlight, her important role in the Enigma project that decrypted Nazi Germany's secret communications earned her awards and citations, such as appointment as a Member of the Order of the British Empire (MBE), in 1946. She was one of the few women employed at Bletchley as a full-fledged cryptanalyst.

=== Betty Webb ===
Betty Webb (née Vine-Stevens) served in the Auxiliary Territorial Service (ATS) from 1941 to 1946, during which time she worked on code breaking at Bletchley Park. Her autobiography, No More Secrets, was published in 2023.

=== Other Selected Women ===
- Eleanor Ireland, who worked on the Colossus computers
- Ruth Briggs, a German scholar, who worked within the Naval Section.
- Rozanne Colchester, a translator who worked mainly for the Italian air forces Section
- Cicely Mayhew, recruited straight from university, who worked in Hut 8, translating decoded German Navy signals

== Legacy and commemorations ==
There have been many efforts to commemorate the contribution of women in Bletchley Park; in particular, there has been a proliferation of online articles devoted to examining the role of women in Bletchley Park during the past five years. Due to the secrecy of Bletchley Park and the United Kingdom's thirty-year rule, it was not until the publishing in 1974 of The Ultra Secret by former RAF officer F. W. Winterbotham (who supervised the distribution of Ultra intelligence) that the wartime role of Bletchley Park began to be discussed, and only in 2009 did the British government award honours to its personnel. There have been efforts to get women who worked in Bletchley Park to meet up some 70 years after they last saw each other, as the women tended not to stay in touch with their coworkers after the war (due to the secret atmosphere back then). Women often did not even know the names of the machines they had worked on until they read books about Bletchley Park released decades after the war; families and friends usually had no idea what these women worked on during the war.

Interviews of women who worked at Bletchley Park have them saying they enjoyed their time there due to doing interesting work and being around interesting people, as well as a sense that they were doing important work (although most never knew just how important their work ended up being). Most women gave up their careers after they left Bletchley Park and got married; however, many of the full-fledged female codebreakers (such as Joan Clarke) went on to have fruitful careers in cryptanalysis (bolstered by the good work they had done in Bletchley Park).

=== Memorials ===
Bletchley Park has a Roll of Honour, which lists everyone in Britain believed to have worked on signals intelligence during World War II, at Bletchley Park and elsewhere; it was compiled from official sources, veterans, friends and families. No complete list of those who worked at Bletchley Park and its outstations was ever produced, so new information is constantly being added to the list. As of July 2017, there are almost 8,000 women listed in the Roll of Honour.

=== Popular culture ===
- The Imitation Game is a film focusing on Alan Turing's life at Bletchley Park; one topic is his relationship with Joan Clarke, one of the few women who worked as a full-fledged codebreaker in Bletchley Park. However, there is some criticism of the movie for portraying codebreaking as a men's game and not talking more about the role of women in codebreaking.
- The Imitation Game, the television play, focusing on the female protagonist's successes and frustrations while working in Bletchley Park.
- The 2012 ITV programme, The Bletchley Circle, is a set of murder mysteries set in 1952 and 1953. The protagonists are four female former Bletchley codebreakers, who use their skills to solve crimes. The pilot episode's opening scene was filmed on-site, and the set was asked to remain there for its close adaptation of historiography.
- Enigma is a 2001 fictional film about the Enigma codebreakers in Bletchley Park where a love affair between coworkers is a main topic.
- The film Hut 33 focuses on day-to-day life in Bletchley Park, and so, discusses women's daily lives in Bletchley Park.
- The Agent Carter season 2 episode "Smoke & Mirrors" reveals that Agent Peggy Carter worked at Bletchley Park early in the war before joining the Strategic Scientific Reserve.
- The novella Signal Moon by Kate Quinn largely centres on one of the Wrens at a listening station.
- The novel The Rose Code by Kate Quinn follows three female codebreakers at Bletchley Park.

== See also ==
- List of people associated with Bletchley Park
- List of women in Bletchley Park
- United States Naval Computing Machine Laboratory, where some women recruited from WAVES worked as codebreakers (one notable such woman being Agnes Meyer Driscoll)
- Wrens at Bletchley Park

== Bibliography ==
- Grey, Christopher (2014) [2012]. Decoding organization : Bletchley Park, codebreaking and organization studies. Cambridge: Cambridge University Press. ISBN 978-0-511-79418-6. OCLC 857275172.
- Hill, Marion (2004). Bletchley Park people : Churchill's geese that never cackled. Stroud, Gloucestershire: Sutton. ISBN 978-0-7509-3362-9. OCLC 1341823626.
- Kahn, David (1991). Seizing the enigma : the race to break the German U-boat codes, 1939-1943. Boston: Houghton Mifflin Co. ISBN 978-0-395-42739-2. OCLC 1280832815.
- McKay, Sinclair (2010). The Secret Life of Bletchley Park. London: White Lion Publishing. ISBN 978-1-84513-539-3.
- Smith, M. (2015). The Debs of Bletchley Park and Other Stories. Aurum. ISBN 978-1-78131-389-3.
- Webb, Betty (2023). No More Secrets: my part in codebreaking at Bletchley Park and the Pentagon. Mardle Books. ISBN 9781837700219.
