= Marjorie Kennedy (librarian) =

Librarian

Marjorie Jean Oswald Kennedy (6 November 1915 – November 2002) was a Scottish librarian who worked at the Bletchley Park code-breaking base during the Second World War and was the moving force behind the creation of The Rock Trust, a Scottish charity for young homeless people.

== Early life ==
Kennedy was born into the Kennedy family of Kilmarnock, the daughter of Robert Kennedy, an engineering managing director, and Susan Hunter Kennedy. She was related to Thomas Kennedy (c.1796–1874) who founded Glenfield & Kennedy, manufacturers of valves, who invented the world's first water meter. She was educated at the private Wellington School, Ayr.

== Second World War ==
Kennedy served in the Women's Royal Naval Service from 1942 to 1945 during the Second World War. She was stationed at HMS Pembroke III, a WRNS training depot at Mill Hill in London in 1942, from where she was posted to HMS Beaver in Hull from 1942 to 1943, and then to HMS Drake, Devonport, in 1943. She returned to HMS Pembroke III and then was at HMS Pembroke V. She served at Bletchley Park between 1943 and 1945.

== Post war ==
After the war, Kennedy lived in London in the 1960s and 1970s but began to work as a librarian at the University of Edinburgh in the 1980s. She was instrumental in the formation of The Rock Trust in 1991, a Scottish charity for young homeless people, after young people were found sleeping rough in the churchyard of St Cuthbert's Parish Church, Edinburgh, a church of which she was an elder.

== Death and legacy ==
Marjorie Kennedy died in Edinburgh in November 2002. Her friends were surprised to find that she left an estate of around £1.5 million which it is thought came mainly from a family inheritance. A selection of her papers are held in the archives of the University of Edinburgh.
