= Eleanor Ireland =

British computer scientist (1926-2020)

Eleanor Dorothy Lillian Ireland (née Outlaw, 7 August 1926 – 22 January 2020) was a British computer scientist and member of the Women's Royal Naval Service.

== Early life ==
Eleanor Outlaw was born in Berkhamsted, Hertfordshire, England on 7 August 1926. She had one sibling, a brother, who was in the Royal Air Force, and later worked for the Ministry of Agriculture and Fisheries as a statistician. Her father worked as a civil servant. Ireland attended Berkhamsted School for Girls from the age of ten, until she left at seventeen. At school, Ireland received distinctions in English language, English literature, French, and Biology.

After she finished school, Ireland moved to London in hopes of studying architecture. Despite being accepted into Regent Street School of Architecture, she ultimately did not attend because of World War II. Ireland believed it would be a waste of money to attend architecture school and risk being sent to war. She instead chose to work at a friend's philatelic shop on Chancery Lane until 1944. It was this year that she joined the Women's Royal Naval Service.

== Career ==
Prior to World War II, Eleanor Ireland worked for a philatelist. Ireland volunteered for the Women's Royal Naval Service (WRNS) in the spring of 1944, and received a letter on 2 August 1944, that she was accepted into the WRNS. Once accepted into the Women's Royal Naval Service, Ireland was kept at Tullichewan Castle, located near Loch Lomond, Scotland. For the first portion of time she was with the WRNS completing lower level work such as cleaning and food preparation. Next, Ireland was transported to Bletchley Park and was informed she was a part of PV Special Duties X. Like other women who wanted a job with the new machines, she had to score highly on a placement test. The work Ireland was involved with was top secret, and she, along with the other women she worked with, were told not to tell anyone any information regarding the work they were doing. The women were all required to sign the Official Secrets Act, promising not to divulge any information regarding their work. Ireland spent the rest of her time with the Women's Royal Naval Service living in Woburn Abbey. After the war, she was an artist.

After the war, she thought about going into interior decoration, but a "very formidable aunt" who taught art at a grammar school in Wolverhampton, persuaded her to study art at Regent Street Polytechnic School of Art, where she spent five years, and then found work doing book illustrations. After her sons grew up, she worked teaching art to adults.

== Working on the Colossus ==
Ireland and Jean Beech, another WRNS employee, worked with a mathematician codebreaker while she was residing in Woburn Abby. She worked with the Colossus II to try to break different combinations of coded messages during World War II that the Germans were transmitting. Colossus had to break the daily encryption settings to solve Tunny code. She had to log all the tapes being sent to her by recording the date and time messages were received and when they were taken off, and then she would load them into the Colossus II. She operated Colossus computers using copper-nickel plated pins and tape. The paper tape would burst during the high speed runs and the workers would use glue to piece all the bits back together.

== Personal life and death ==
She married Dennis Ireland, a microbiologist who worked in research for Glaxo, and they had two sons, Robin and Toby.

Eleanor Ireland died in Cornwall on 22 January 2020, at the age of 93.

== Sources ==
- Copeland, B. Jack; Bowen, Jonathan P.; Sprevak, Mark; Wilson, Robin (2017). "We were the world's first computer operators". The Turing Guide. Oxford University Press.
