= Rozanne Colchester =

Rozanne Felicity Hastings Colchester (née Medhurst, 10 November 1922 – 17 November 2016) worked in British intelligence in the 1940s.

== Early life ==
Colchester was the daughter of Sir Charles Medhurst, an air attaché to the British embassy in Rome, and lived in Italy as a teenager. Colchester met Mussolini and Hitler before the Second World War, describing Mussolini as a "horrid man". Her brother "Dickie" Medhurst became a Pilot Officer and died during Operation Market Garden in 1944.

== Career ==
In 1941, aged 19, she joined Bletchley Park as a decoder. Her father, himself involved in intelligence, recruited her. She spoke fluent Italian which led to her joining the RAF section. Following a successful interview at the Foreign Office she was immediately taken on and completed two days' training delivered by Joe Hooper. She was billeted in nearby Fenny Stratford.

Colchester entered one of “Britain’s most secret organisations”, Bletchley Park. The majority of Bletchley Park “was based on the forensic decrypting and ordering of thousands of enemies messages”. Colchester played a massive role in the “decrypting and ordering” of the enemy's incoming hand-encrypted messages, along with many other women working alongside Colchester at Bletchley Park. Due to Colchester’s past experience of decoding skills, this helped in uncovering many of the “general patterns of communications and confirmed logistical information”.

She personally decrypted a high-grade Italian cypher overnight in 1943, which uncovered that the Italian air force was going to leave Tripoli that morning at 4am to bomb Sicily. Due to the intelligence, Allied forces were able to shoot down the bombers before they launched their assault.

During Colchester’s 2010 interview with The Guardian newspaper, she mentioned how the conditions during her time at Bletchley Park were “very hard”, adding to this Colchester described the work as “monotonous, sluggish work”, but stated how gradually she began to understand the coding more and more as time went on. She also said that "it was so intense. There were such a lot of very clever and eccentric people shut away in the strange isolation. I remember Alan Turing, he was very shy and awfully sweet. We used to have coffee after lunch in the canteen".

After the war, she worked for the Secret Intelligence Service in an undisclosed role. She served in Cairo and Istanbul where she helped investigate the double agent Kim Philby.

== Personal life ==
In 1946, she married Halsey Sparrowe Colchester, who became vicar of Great Tew and Little Tew, Oxfordshire, having previously been a Foreign Office diplomat and head of personnel at MI6. They had had met in Cairo. They had four sons and a daughter.

Colchester died in 2016.
