= Dorothy Du Boisson =

British codebreaker

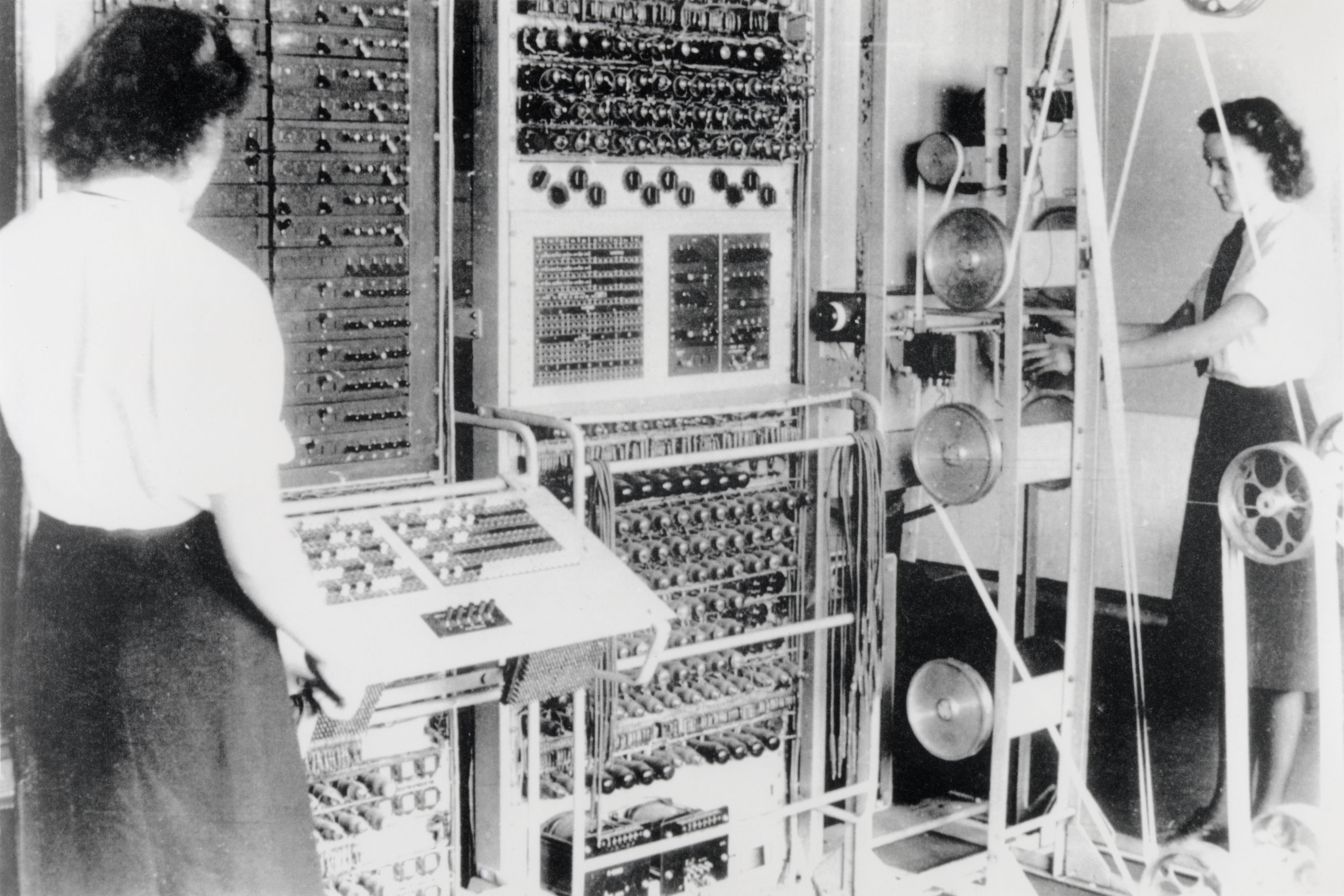
- A Colossus Mark 2 computer being operated by Dorothy Du Boisson (left) and Elsie Booker (right)

Dorothy Du Boisson, MBE (26 November 1919 – 1 February 2013) was a code breaker stationed at Bletchley Park during World War II.

== Bletchley Park ==
Du Boisson joined the Women's Royal Naval Service (known as WRNS) during WWII and was stationed at the Newmanry sector of Bletchley Park, England. With others she operated code-breaking machines, such as the Tunny machine Heath Robinson. She was one of only four operators working with the Tunny but, to work efficiently, she had to learn how to operate the Heath Robinson as well. After the Colossus computer was developed, she operated it under the direction of a cryptographer.

When more Wrens were posted, Du Boisson came off the machines and went into the Ops Rooms as a registrar. She was responsible for logging the tapes in and out and distributing them to the machines. Since she was one of only two people working in the Ops room, Du Boisson had a tremendous amount of work to do. She recorded the date and identity of each tape used on the Colossus and Tunny. She knew exactly where each tape was and the machine time spent on it. Moreover, she was also responsible for unwinding tapes into buckets and joining them into a loop. This was an essential step for operation, since the tape might not stand up to the speed of the machine. After many experiments, Du Boisson found a unique way to strengthen it by using a special glue, a warm clamp, and French chalk. After the war, the machines were smashed into fragments on the orders of Churchill. Later, Du Boisson worked as a typist in the Air Ministry.

== Career ==
To perform the data analysis well, "Du Boisson and other operators in Wrens needed to first get the data from a partially electronic machine named Heath Robinson. If it could perform its analysis successfully, the resulting data would be run through the Tunny machine."

Most of the workers were between 20 and 22 years of age. They attended training sessions to get more familiar with the machines, how they operate and the maintenance procedures. The working shifts could last up to 70 hours per week because many machines kept running all the time and there were few people who knew how to operate them. It was necessary for those people to work three eight-hour shifts every day for several weeks. Moreover, due to this stressful workload, many errors in the operations started to appear. Due to limitations in the machines, when a mistake was found, in many cases, it was necessary to redo the work all over again.

== Living and working conditions ==
Workers had to perform a series of strict jobs within a tight schedule. Due to restrictions on outside policies, workers had to spend most of the time locked in rooms without proper ventilation and luminosity. Moreover, many employees even lived there, usually in attics that were not actually prepared. "The attic was cold and very damp," and they had to "put newspapers in the bed to keep warm." The poor conditions of the buildings and the machinery with lots of electrical cables also were not a good combination, since it was common to have fires. Also, the food was not good and the water that was sometimes contaminated. "We suffered from exhaust and malnutrition".

== Results ==
Employees at Bletchley Park did not know what they were doing and how their work was going to be used. They were expected to simply follow orders given by their superiors and were prohibited from asking questions or making comments about their work.

Like other members of Wrens, Du Boisson knew little of Bletchley's successes on the codebreaking. They got some information about what they had been doing once a month. They were also responsible for collecting information for the war. "Every German officer had a card and each time his name appeared in the message, all the details were noted. Once, we were told, a senior German officer has sent a coded message asking for the luggage of his mistress to be forwarded. Our people were delighted to read it since his regiment had not been heard of for several months."

== Contribution ==
The engineer who designed and constructed the prototype Colossus, Thomas Flowers, said "Bletchley Park changed the course of history and the praise that the cryptanalysts have received is well merited, but nothing has ever been said about the many people who worked like slaves for over a year to create Colossus and get it into service by D-day". Indeed, without the hard work of Du Boisson and other Wren girls, Colossus would not have been able to function well. The fact that the first fully satisfactory Colossus was put into service before D-day was no coincidence. They worked flat out for four months and met the deadline. The decoding at Bletchley Park did ensure that the Germans could not get there at the time that the American troops were landing. Eisenhower stated that without the information Bletchley had applied, the war would have gone on for at least two years longer than it did.

== Death ==
Du Boisson suffered an infection and died in hospital on 2 February 2013.
