= Wrens at Bletchley Park =

Machine operators, Women's Royal Naval Service

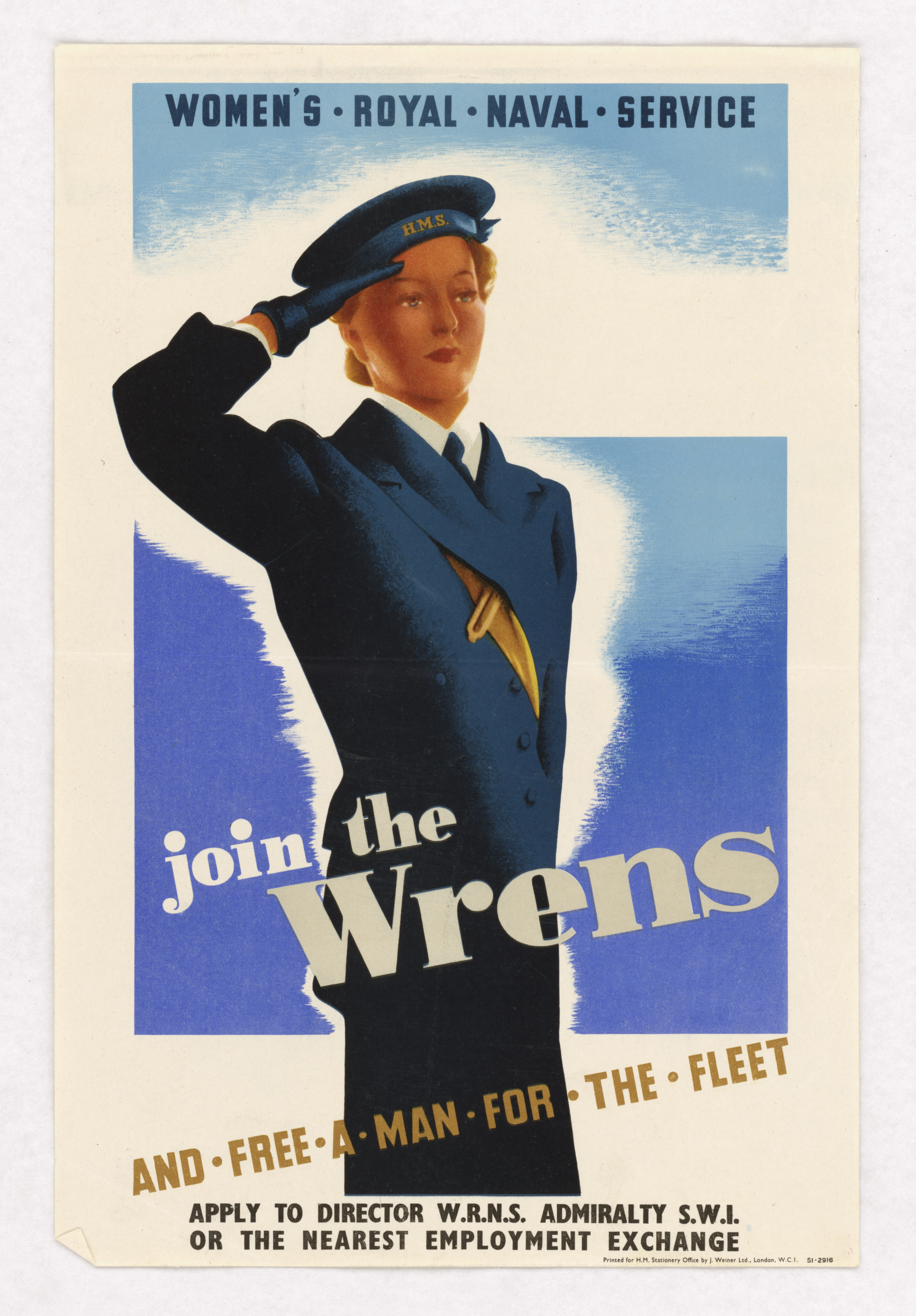

Wrens at Bletchley Park were females enlisted in the Women's Royal Naval Service who worked at Bletchley Park, the principal centre of Allied code-breaking during World War II. Codebreakers succeeded in decoding the secret communications of the Axis powers, most importantly those of Nazi Germany, a major contribution to the success of the Allies in defeating the Axis. A total of 2,963 Wrens, about one third of the total complement of codebreaking employees, worked at Bletchley Park and its outlying stations during the war. Most of the Wrens operated the Bombe code-breaking machines and the Colossus computers which broke the ciphers used by the German military and used the decoded information in military operations.

== Background ==
In World War II, the Women's Royal Naval Service, abbreviated WRNS or more popularly Wrens, provided the largest number of workers at Bletchley Park from any organization, military or civilian. The Wrens were the elite women's military organization in Britain which has contributed to the cliche of the "Debs" (debutantes) at Bletchley Park. Author Christopher Gray suggests that the leaders (all men) of Bletchley Park believed that well-educated, middle-class people from good schools and good families had more "integrity" for secret work than the lower classes. Employing women at Bletchley Park was deemed necessary because of a shortage of men due to the demand for men by the armed forces and also desirable because women were paid lower salaries for doing the same work as men. Military officers were paid more than civilians and typically had a salary of £500 or more annually; the highest salary among Wrens was £130 per year. The rank and file of women in the armed forces had a salary of £30 annually (although their food and lodging was provided by the organisation). Most of the Wrens were in their early 20s; a few were teenagers.

All the Wrens, as well as all other employees at Bletchley, were required to sign the Official Secrets Act. Their commitment to secrecy was fortified by "ominous lectures and warnings". The secrets of Bletchley Park did not become public until the mid 1970s, almost 30 years after the end of the war.

== Jobs ==
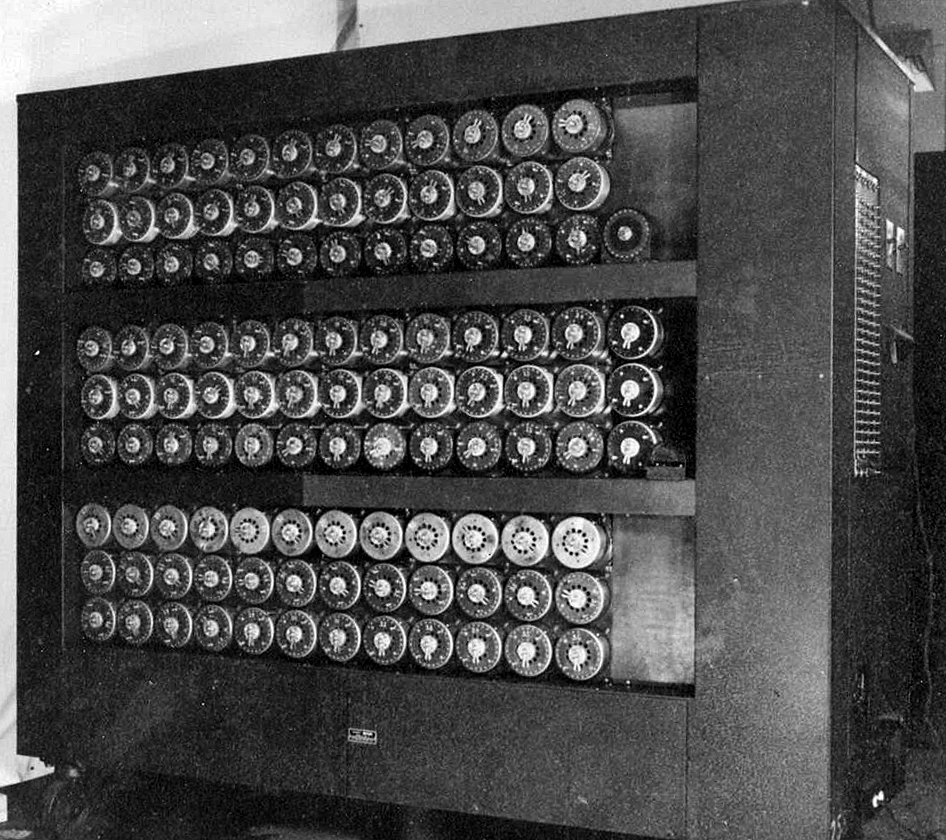
A bombe at Bletchley Park

Wrens performed many functions at Bletchley Park and its outlying stations, but their main function was operating the bombe decoding machines and the Colossus computers. Eight Wrens arrived at Bletchley on 24 March 1941 to operate bombes. It was an experiment to see if they could do the job. Their numbers quickly expanded as they proved themselves. Invented by Polish scientists and improved by Gordon Welchman and Alan Turing, bombes were the means to decode German coded messages generated by the enigma machine. Each bombe weighed a ton and consisted of 108 rotating drums in 36 sets of three. The bombes were made up of thousands of parts and miles of wiring. The bombes were labour-intensive, requiring the drums to be reset often for messages to be decoded. Ultimately, there were 211 bombes scattered around England which required 1,676 Wrens and 243 male Royal Air Force personnel to operate with supervision and operating instructions by cryptoanalysts. Three to five thousand coded German messages were intercepted daily. Most were inconsequential; a few were vital to allied success in the war.

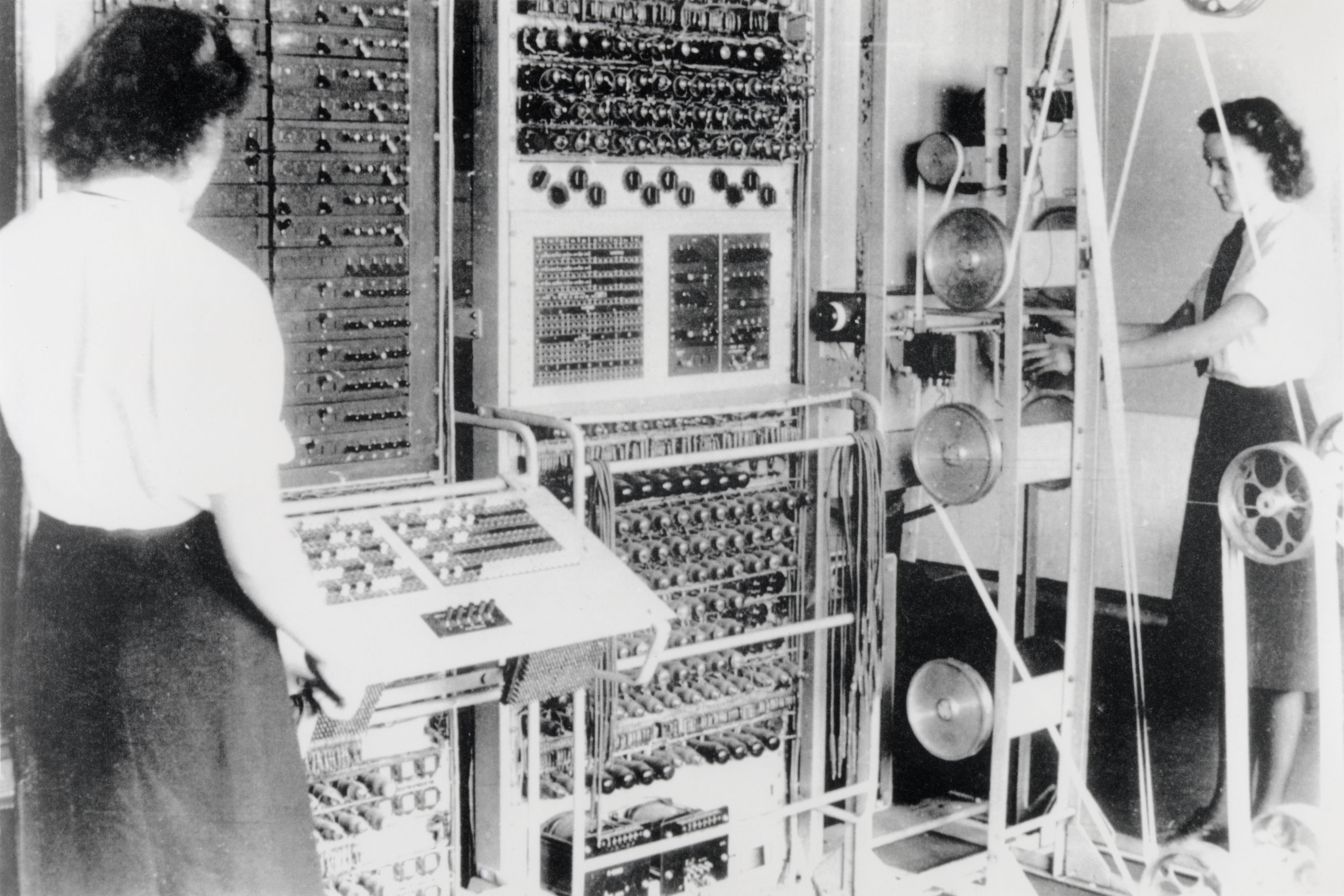
Two Wrens operate a Colossus computer

Operating the bombes was an exacting, difficult, and dirty job. The Wrens worked in pairs. One wired each bombe while the other monitored the outcome. Women five feet eight or taller were desired due to the height of the machine and the difficulty of reaching the top drums. One Wren said "the back of the machine defies description – a mass of dangling plugs ... and a multitude of wires, every one of which had to be meticulously adjusted with tweezers to make sure the electrical circuits did not short." The bombes were noisy, smelly, and dripped black oil. A visiting Admiral objected to the Wrens dressed in practical overalls and afterwards they were required to wear uniforms on duty. The bombes were operated 24 hours a day in three shifts of eight hours each. Security was paramount. The Wrens were told only that they "were breaking German codes". Owing to the strict isolation of one section from others at Bletchley, the Wrens knew little about the results of their work.

The room-sized Colossus computers began work in early 1944. They were the first programmable computers and enabled the code-breakers to process intercepted messages far more rapidly that had the bombes. 130 Wrens worked on the ten Colossus computers. They operated the Colossus under the supervision of a duty officer. The output was statistical and mathematical and required interpretation. As with the bombes the work was exacting, but in this case the Wrens, under more enlightened management, were encouraged to improve their knowledge of what the machines did and its importance. A few women took on cryptography and testing machines, roles typically assigned to men.

In 1943, after training, 60 Wrens were sent to Colombo, Ceylon to focus on breaking Japanese codes. They travelled on a troop ship with 5,000 male soldiers.

Very few Wrens were promoted into managerial or analytical positions during the war. They were among the labourers and foot soldiers of Bletchley Park.

== Off duty ==
For the Wrens, life at Bletchley Park was "secrecy and semi-imprisonment". "Naval protocol was ever present." They worked eight hours a day in a rigid pattern of morning, evening, and nighttime shifts. One day a week was free. They were forbidden to dress in civilian clothes and usually housed in barracks or imposed on home-owners in the town and vicinity. The Wrens were transported to work from their residences by bus. They were forbidden, as were all Bletchley Park employees, to talk about their work, even with each other. Romances were common. As one male employee said, the "hothouse confinement" created an atmosphere in which "sexual infatuations ... became obsessional." However, in conformity with the manners of the day, attractions between the sexes were usually romantic rather than sexual. A few couples married. Hut 2 at Bletchley Park was devoted to employee recreation and an extensive programme of dance, theatre and other activities helped to maintain morale.
