= The Imitation Game =

2014 film by Morten Tyldum

- British theatrical release poster
- Directed by: Morten Tyldum
- Written by: Graham Moore
- Based on: Alan Turing: The Enigma by Andrew Hodges
- Produced by: Nora Grossman; Ido Ostrowsky; Teddy Schwarzman
- Starring: Benedict Cumberbatch; Keira Knightley; Matthew Goode; Rory Kinnear; Charles Dance; Mark Strong
- Cinematography: Óscar Faura
- Edited by: William Goldenberg
- Music by: Alexandre Desplat
- Production companies: Black Bear Pictures; Bristol Automotive; Orange Corp
- Distributed by: The Weinstein Company
- Release dates: August 29, 2014 (Telluride); November 14, 2014 (United States)
- Running time: 115 minutes
- Country: United States
- Language: English
- Budget: $14 million
- Box office: $233.6 million

The Imitation Game is a 2014 American biographical thriller film directed by Morten Tyldum and written by Graham Moore, based on the 1983 biography Alan Turing: The Enigma by Andrew Hodges. The film's title quotes the name of the game cryptanalyst Alan Turing proposed for answering the question "Can machines think?", in his 1950 seminal paper "Computing Machinery and Intelligence". The film stars Benedict Cumberbatch as Turing, who devised new methods for decrypting German intelligence messages for the British government during World War II. Keira Knightley, Matthew Goode, Rory Kinnear, Charles Dance, and Mark Strong appear in supporting roles.

Following its premiere at the Telluride Film Festival on August 29, 2014, The Imitation Game was released theatrically in the United States by The Weinstein Company on November 14. It grossed over $233 million worldwide on a $14 million production budget, making it the highest-grossing independent film of 2014. The film received critical acclaim but faced significant criticism for its historical inaccuracies, including depicting several events that had never taken place in real life. It received eight nominations at the 87th Academy Awards (including Best Picture), winning for Best Adapted Screenplay. It also received five nominations at the Golden Globes, three at the SAG Awards and nine at the BAFTAs. Cumberbatch and Knightley's highly acclaimed performances were nominated for Best Actor and Best Supporting Actress respectively at each award.

== Plot ==
In 1928, Alan Turing, 16, bullied at boarding school, befriends Christopher Morcom, who sparks his interest in cryptography. Turing develops romantic feelings, but Christopher dies of bovine tuberculosis before Turing can confess.

When Britain declares war on Germany in 1939, established mathematician Turing joins the cryptography team of Hugh Alexander, John Cairncross, Peter Hilton, Keith Furman, and Charles Richards in Bletchley Park, directed by Commander Alastair Denniston. Their mission is analysis of the Enigma machine the Wehrmacht uses to send coded messages. Difficult to work with, and denigrating his colleagues, Turing works alone to design a deciphering machine he names "Christopher". When Denniston refuses to fund the £100,000 construction cost, Turing contacts Prime Minister Winston Churchill, who appoints him team leader and provides funds. Firing Furman and Richards, Turing places a difficult crossword in newspapers as a test to find replacements.

Cambridge graduate Joan Clarke passes Turing's test but her conservative parents refuse her permission to live and work with male cryptographers. Turing arranges for her to work on cryptography while living with the women who intercept messages. Clarke helps Turing relate to the others, who begin to respect him. Christopher is constructed but cannot determine the Enigma encryption settings quickly enough, as the Germans reset them daily. When Denniston orders Christopher destroyed and Turing fired, the other cryptographers realize only a machine can calculate quickly enough to break the daily settings and threaten to leave. Under pressure from her parents, Clarke plans to quit; Turing proposes marriage and she accepts. During their engagement party, Turing confirms his homosexuality to Cairncross, who advises him to keep it a secret.

Overhearing a clerk talking about predictable German phrases and repetitive formats received from the same German coder, Turing has an epiphany: he can program the machine to decode words he knows exist in certain messages, such as "Wetterbericht" (weather report) and "Heil Hitler". The theory is proven correct, revealing enough of the daily Enigma code to permit decoding that day's messages. The cryptographers celebrate this breakthrough. Discovering through decoded intercepts that a convoy is in danger of German attack, Turing fears a sudden response will notify the Germans that Enigma is compromised. The team concludes they cannot act on every decoded message. They issue no warning about the attack, even though Peter, whose brother is serving in the convoy, begs them. Turing creates a statistical model to determine the maximum percentage of intelligence to act on while minimizing the risk of German suspicion.

Uncovering Cairncross as a Soviet spy, Turing confronts him. Arguing the Soviets are allies working for the same goals, Cairncross threatens to retaliate by disclosing Turing's sexuality. When MI6 agent Stewart Menzies appears to threaten Clarke, Turing shares his revelation about Cairncross. Menzies reveals he already knows and is using Cairncross to leak information to Soviet allies that Churchill is reluctant to share. Fearing for Clarke's safety, Turing breaks their engagement, admits his homosexuality, and urges Clarke to leave Bletchley Park. She admits always being suspicious but insists they can be happy together anyway. Turing replies he only used her for her cryptography skills and never cared for her. The heartbroken Clarke stays on, defying her parents and Turing.

After the war, the cryptographers are ordered to destroy all traces of the project, as MI6 does not want other governments to trace individuals who know how to break machine encryption. The team is instructed never to meet again or share what they have done. In 1951, Turing is questioned by police after reporting a home break-in by a homosexual lover. He obliquely refers to his work at Bletchley Park during World War II. In 1952, accused of illegal homosexual behavior, Turing is convicted of gross indecency and undergoes chemical castration to be spared prison. Clarke visits him, witnesses his physical and mental deterioration, and tries to comfort him.

The epilogue shows Turing committed suicide on June 7, 1954, after a year of government-mandated hormonal therapy. In 2013, Queen Elizabeth II granted him a posthumous Royal Pardon. Historians estimate that breaking Enigma shortened the war by over 2 years, saving over 14 million lives. Turing's work is now recognized as an essential step toward the development of modern computers.

== Cast ==
- Benedict Cumberbatch as Alan Turing
  - Alex Lawther as young Alan Turing
- Keira Knightley as Joan Clarke
- Matthew Goode as Hugh Alexander
- Rory Kinnear as Detective Robert Nock
- Allen Leech as John Cairncross
- Matthew Beard as Peter Hilton
- Charles Dance as Commander Denniston
- Mark Strong as Stewart Menzies
- James Northcote as Jack Good
- Tom Goodman-Hill as Sergeant Staehl
- Steven Waddington as Superintendent Smith
- Ilan Goodman as Keith Furman
- Jack Tarlton as Charles Richards
- Jack Bannon as Christopher Morcom
- Tuppence Middleton as Helen Stewart
- Andrew Havill as Teacher
- James G. Nunn as Sherbourne
- Victoria Wicks as Dorothy Clarke (Joan's mother)

== Production ==
=== Development ===
Before Cumberbatch joined the project, Warner Bros. bought the screenplay for a reported seven-figure sum because of Leonardo DiCaprio's interest in playing Turing. In the end, DiCaprio did not come on board and the rights of the script reverted to the screenwriter. Black Bear Pictures subsequently committed to finance the film for $14 million. Various directors were attached during development including Ron Howard and David Yates. In December 2012, it was announced that Morten Tyldum would direct, making the film his English-language directorial debut.

=== Production design ===
The bombe seen in the film is based on a replica of Turing's original machine, which is housed in the museum at Bletchley Park. However, production designer Maria Djurkovic admitted that her team made the machine more cinematic by making it larger and having more of its internal mechanisms visible.

The costumes were designed by Sammy Sheldon Differ, using as many authentically 1940s pieces as possible. Benedict Cumberbatch had "frequent conversations" with Differ to develop his character's wardrobe and physical mannerisms. Where original costumes were not available, the team commissioned reproductions, using appropriate fabrics like linen and cotton. Differ explained, "those materials can be made to drape in a particular way, and the way they sit on the body resists duplication".

=== Filming ===
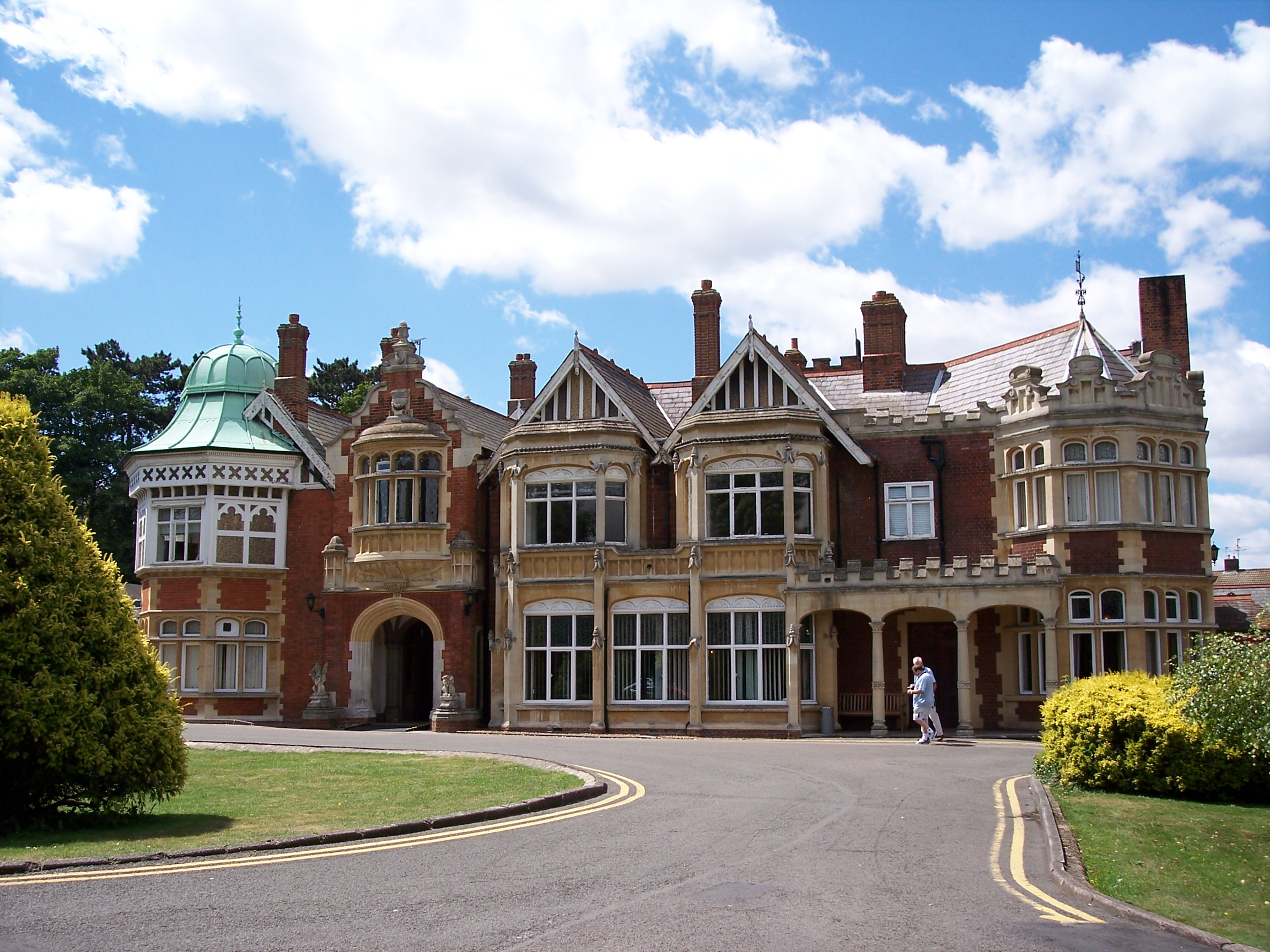
Bletchley Park, "the home of the codebreakers" where parts of the film were shot

Principal photography began on September 15, 2013, in Britain. Filming locations included Turing's former school, Sherborne, Bletchley Park, where Turing and his colleagues worked during the war, and Central Saint Martins campus on Southampton Row in London. Other locations included towns in England such as Nettlebed (Joyce Grove in Oxfordshire) and Chesham (Buckinghamshire). Scenes were also filmed at Bicester Airfield and outside the Law Society building in Chancery Lane, and at West London Film Studios. Principal photography finished on November 11, 2013.

The Weinstein Company acquired the film for $7 million in February 2014, the highest amount ever paid for US distribution rights at the European Film Market. The film was also a recipient of Tribeca Film Festival's Sloan Filmmaker Fund, which grants filmmakers funding and guidance with regard to innovative films that are concerned with science, mathematics, and technology.

=== Music ===
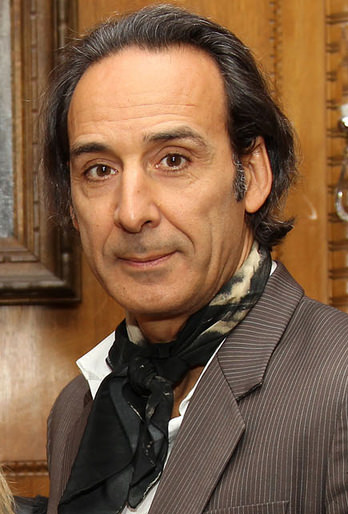
Desplat composed the film's score in under three weeks.

In June 2014, it was announced that Alexandre Desplat would compose the film's score. It was recorded by the London Symphony Orchestra at Abbey Road Studios in London. Desplat uses continuous piano arpeggios to represent both Turing's thinking mind and the workings of a mechanical machine. He said of the complexity of the continuity and structure of the score:

[W]hen the camera at the end of the film has those beautiful shots of the young boy, the young Alan, and he's meeting with the professor who's telling him his friend Christopher is dead, and the camera is pushing in on him, I play Christopher's theme that we heard very early on in the film. There's a simple continuity there. It's the accumulation of these moments that I can slowly but surely play that makes it even stronger.

The score received an Academy Award nomination for Best Original Score, losing to the score of The Grand Budapest Hotel, also composed by Desplat.

== Release ==
=== Marketing ===
Following the Royal Pardon granted by the British government to Turing on December 24, 2013, the filmmakers released the first official promotional photograph of Cumberbatch in character beside Turing's bombe. In the week of the anniversary of Turing's death in June 2014, Entertainment Weekly released two new stills which marked the first look at the characters played by Keira Knightley, Matthew Goode, Matthew Beard, and Allen Leech. On what would have been Turing's 102nd birthday on June 23, Empire released two photographs featuring Mark Strong and Charles Dance in character. Promotional stills were taken by photographer Jack English, who also photographed Cumberbatch for Tinker Tailor Soldier Spy.

Princeton University Press and Vintage Books both released film tie-in editions of Andrew Hodges' biography Alan Turing: The Enigma in September 2014. The first UK and US trailers were released on July 22, 2014. The international teaser poster was released on September 18, 2014, with the tagline "The true enigma was the man who cracked the code".

In November 2014, the Weinstein Company co-hosted a private screening of the film with Digital Sky Technologies billionaire Yuri Milner and Facebook CEO Mark Zuckerberg. Attendees of the screening at Los Altos Hills, California included Silicon Valley's top executives, such as Facebook COO Sheryl Sandberg, LinkedIn's Reid Hoffman, Google co-founder Sergey Brin, Airbnb's Nathan Blecharczyk, and Theranos founder Elizabeth Holmes. Director Tyldum, screenwriter Moore, and actress Knightley were also in attendance. In addition, Cumberbatch and Zuckerberg presented the Mathematics Prizes at the Breakthrough Awards on November 10, 2014, in honour of Turing.

The bombe re-created by the filmmakers was on display in a special The Imitation Game exhibition at Bletchley Park beginning November 10, 2014. The year-long exhibit featured clothes worn by the actors and props used in the film.

The official film website allowed visitors to unlock exclusive content by solving cryptic crossword puzzles supposedly conceived by Turing. The website puzzle was a shorter version of the Daily Telegraph puzzle of January 13, 1942 that was actually used in Bletchley Park recruitment during the war (and the puzzle was not set by Turing, who was no good at them). Google, which sponsored the New York Premiere of the film, launched a competition called "The Code-Cracking Challenge" on November 23, 2014. It is a skill contest where entrants must crack a code provided by Google. The prize/s will be awarded to entrant/s who crack the code and submit their entry the fastest.

In November 2014, ahead of the film's US release, The New York Times reprinted the 1942 puzzle from The Daily Telegraph used in recruiting codebreakers at Bletchley Park during the Second World War. Entrants who solved the puzzle could mail in their results for a chance to win a trip for two to London and a tour of Bletchley Park.

TWC launched a print and online campaign on January 2, 2015, featuring testimonials from leaders in the fields of technology, military, academia, and LGBTQ groups (all influenced by Turing's life and accomplishments) to promote the film and Turing's legacy. Yahoo! CEO Marissa Mayer, Netflix CEO Reed Hastings, Google Executive Chairman Eric Schmidt, Twitter CEO Dick Costolo, PayPal co-founder Max Levchin, YouTube CEO Susan Wojcicki, and Wikipedia's Jimmy Wales all gave tribute quotes. There were also testimonials from LGBT leaders including HRC president Chad Griffin and GLAAD CEO Sarah Kate Ellis and from military leaders including the 22nd United States Defense Secretary Robert Gates.

=== Theatrical release ===
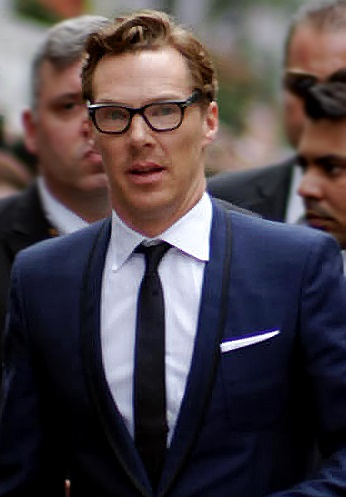
Cumberbatch at the premiere of the film at TIFF, September 2014

The film had its world premiere at the 41st Telluride Film Festival in August 2014, and played at the 39th Toronto International Film Festival in September. It had its European premiere as the opening film of the 58th BFI London Film Festival in October 2014. It began a limited theatrical release on November 28, 2014, in the United States, two weeks after its premiere in the United Kingdom on November 14. The US distributor TWC stated that the film would initially debut in four cinemas in Los Angeles and New York, expanding to six new markets on December 12, before being released nationwide on Christmas Day.

=== Home media ===
The Imitation Game was released on March 31, 2015, in the United States in two formats: a one-disc standard DVD and a Blu-ray with a digital copy of the film.

== Reception ==
=== Box office ===
The Imitation Game grossed $91.1 million in the United States and Canada, and $142.4 million in other territories, for a worldwide total of $233.5 million, against a budget of $14 million. It was the top-grossing independent film release of 2014.

Debuting in four theaters in Los Angeles and New York on November 28, the film grossed $479,352 in its opening weekend with a $119,352 per-screen-average, the second highest per-screen-average of 2014 and the 7th highest of all time for a live-action film. Adjusted for inflation, it outperformed The King's Speech ($88,863 in 2010) and The Artist ($51,220 in 2011), which were also released on their respective Thanksgiving weekends. The film expanded into additional markets on December 12 and was released nationwide on Christmas Day.

The film opened at number two at the UK box office behind Interstellar, earning $4.3 million from 459 screens. Its opening was 107% higher than Argo, 81% higher than Philomena and 26% higher than The Iron Lady.

=== Critical response ===
On Rotten Tomatoes, The Imitation Game holds an approval rating of 90% based on 285 reviews, with an average rating of 7.7/10. The site's critical consensus reads: "With an outstanding starring performance from Benedict Cumberbatch illuminating its fact-based story, The Imitation Game serves as an eminently well-made entry in the 'prestige biopic' genre." On Metacritic, the film has a weighted average score of 71 out of 100, based on 49 critics, indicating "generally favorable reviews". The film received a rare average grade of "A+" from market-research firm CinemaScore, and a 90% "definite recommend" rating from its core audience, according to PostTrak. It was also included in both the National Board of Review and American Film Institute's "Top 10 Films of 2014".

The New York Observer's Rex Reed declared that "one of the most important stories of the last century is one of the greatest movies of 2014". Kaleem Aftab of The Independent gave the film a five-star review, hailing it the "Best British Film of the Year". Empire described it as a "superb thriller" and Glamour declared it "an instant classic". Peter Debruge of Variety added that the film is "beautifully written, elegantly mounted and poignantly performed". Critic Scott Foundas stated that the "movie is undeniably strong in its sense of a bright light burned out too soon, and the often undignified fate of those who dare to chafe at society's established norms". Critic Leonard Maltin asserted that the film has "an ideal ensemble cast with every role filled to perfection". Praise went to Knightley's supporting performance as Clarke, Goldenberg's editing, Desplat's score, Faura's cinematography and Djurkovic's production design. The film was enthusiastically received at the Telluride Film Festival and won the "People's Choice Award for Best Film" at TIFF, the highest prize of the festival.

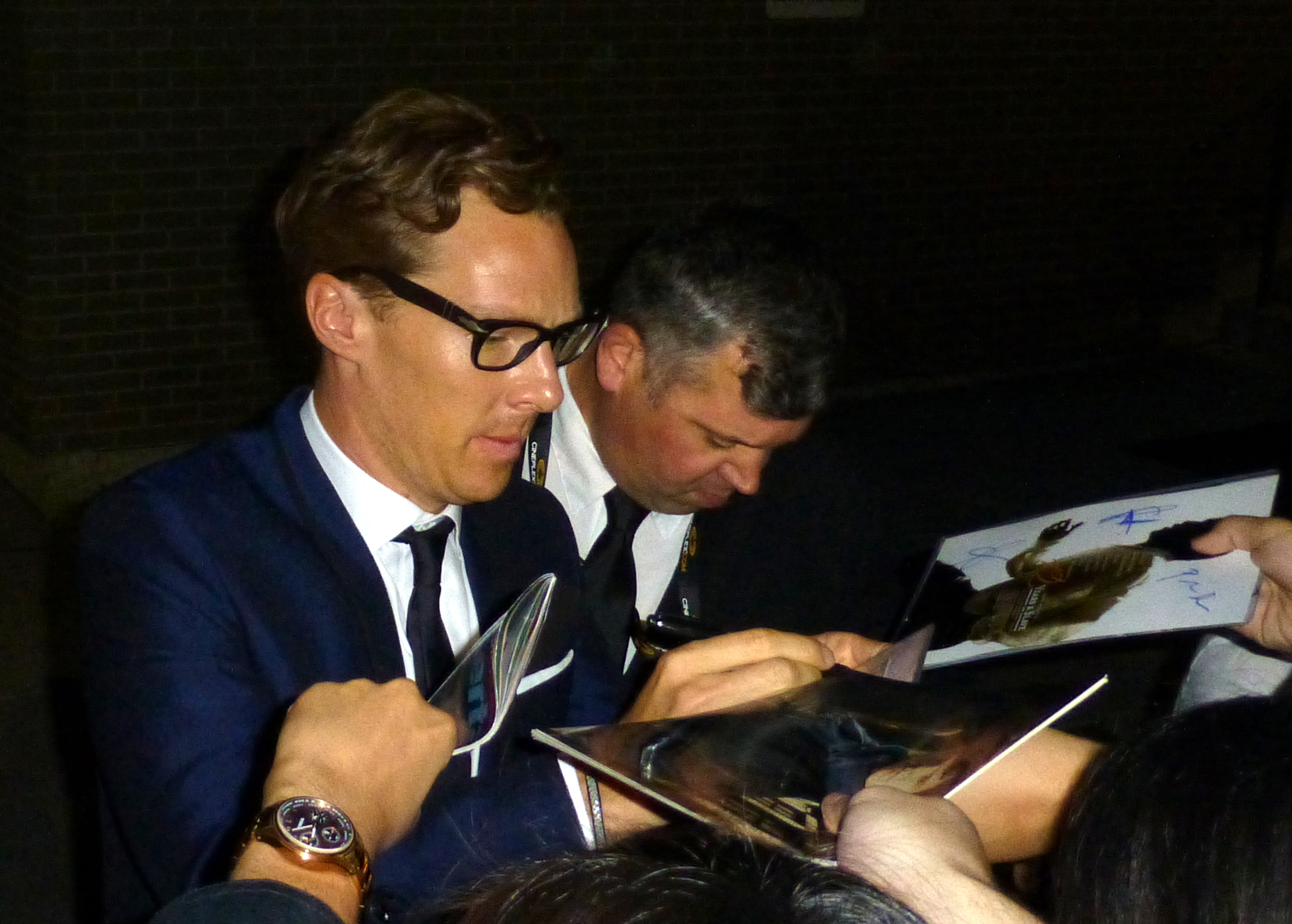
Cumberbatch signing autographs at the Toronto International Film Festival, September 2014

Cumberbatch's performance was met with widespread acclaim from critics. TIME ranked Cumberbatch's portrayal number one in its Top 10 film performances of 2014, with the magazine's chief film critic Richard Corliss calling Cumberbatch's characterisation "the actor's oddest, fullest, most Cumberbatchian character yet ... he doesn't play Turing so much as inhabit him, bravely and sympathetically but without mediation". Kenneth Turan of the Los Angeles Times declared Turing "the role of Cumberbatch's career", while A.O. Scott of The New York Times stated that it is "one of the year's finest pieces of screen acting". Peter Travers of Rolling Stone asserted that the actor "gives an explosive, emotionally complex" portrayal. Critic Clayton Davis stated that it is a "performance for the ages ... proving he's one of the best actors working today". Foundas of Variety wrote that Cumberbatch's acting is "masterful ... a marvel to watch", Manohla Dargis of The New York Times described it as "delicately nuanced, prickly and tragic" and Owen Gleiberman of the BBC proclaimed it an "emotionally tailored perfection". It is "a storming performance from Cumberbatch: you'll be deciphering his work long after the credits roll" declared Dave Calhoun of Time Out. In addition, Claudia Puig of USA Today concluded in her review, "It's Cumberbatch's nuanced, haunted performance that leaves the most powerful impression". The Hollywood Reporter's Todd McCarthy reported that the undeniable highlight of the film was Cumberbatch, "whose charisma, tellingly modulated and naturalistic array of eccentricities, talent at indicating a mind never at rest and knack for simultaneously portraying physical oddness and attractiveness combine to create an entirely credible portrait of genius at work". Gossip blogger Roger Friedman wrote at the end of his review, "Cumberbatch may be the closest thing we have to a real descendant of Sir Laurence Olivier".

While praising the performances of Cumberbatch and Knightley, Catherine Shoard of The Guardian stated that the film is "too formulaic, too efficient at simply whisking you through and making sure you've clocked the diversity message," going on to raise concerns about the film's alleged reluctance to show Turing "romantically or sexually involved with a man". Tim Robey of The Telegraph described it as "a film about a human calculator which feels ... a little too calculated". British historian Alex von Tunzelmann, writing for The Guardian in November 2014, pointed out many historical inaccuracies in the film, saying in conclusion: "Historically, The Imitation Game is as much of a garbled mess as a heap of unbroken code". Journalist Christian Caryl also found numerous historical inaccuracies, describing the film as constituting "a bizarre departure from the historical record" that changed Turing's rich life to be "multiplex-friendly". L.V. Anderson of Slate magazine compared the film's account of Turing's life and work to the biography it was based on, writing, "I discovered that The Imitation Game takes major liberties with its source material, injecting conflict where none existed, inventing entirely fictional characters, rearranging the chronology of events, and misrepresenting the very nature of Turing's work at Bletchley Park". Andrew Grant of Science News wrote, "... like so many other Hollywood biopics, it takes some major artistic license – which is disappointing, because Turing's actual story is so compelling." Computing historian Thomas Haigh, writing in the journal Communications of the ACM, said that "the film is a bad guide to reality but a useful summary of everything that the popular imagination gets wrong about Bletchley Park", that it "combines the traditional focus of popular science writing on the lone genius who changes the world with the modern movie superhero narrative of a freak who must overcome his own flaws before he can save the world", and that, together with the likes of A Beautiful Mind and The Theory of Everything, is part of a trend of "glossy scientific biopic[s]" that emphasize those famous scientists who were surrounded by tragedy rather than those who found contented lives, which in turn affects the way "[s]ome kinds of people, and work, have become famous and others have not."

=== The Turing family ===
Despite earlier reservations, Turing's niece Inagh Payne told Allan Beswick of BBC Radio Manchester that the film "really did honour my uncle" after she watched the film at the London Film Festival in October 2014. In the same interview, Turing's nephew Dermot Turing stated that Cumberbatch is "perfect casting. I couldn't think of anyone better." James Turing, a great-nephew of the code-breaker, said Cumberbatch "knows things that I never knew before. The amount of knowledge he has about Alan is amazing."

=== Accolades ===
The Imitation Game was nominated for, and received, numerous awards, with Cumberbatch's portrayal of Turing particularly praised. The film and its cast and crew were also honoured by Human Rights Campaign, the largest LGBT civil rights advocacy group and political lobbying organisation in the United States. "We are proud to honor the stars and filmmakers of The Imitation Game for bringing the captivating yet tragic story of Alan Turing to the big screen", HRC president Chad Griffin said in a statement.

== Social action ==
In January 2015, Cumberbatch, comedian-actor Stephen Fry, producer Harvey Weinstein, and Turing's great-niece Rachel Barnes launched a campaign to pardon the 49,000 gay men convicted under the same law that led to Turing's chemical castration. An open letter published in The Guardian urged the British government and the Royal family, particularly Queen Elizabeth II and the Duke and Duchess of Cambridge, to aid the campaign.

The Human Rights Campaign's Chad Griffin also offered his endorsement, saying that "Over 49,000 other gay men and women were persecuted in England under the same law. Turing was pardoned by Queen Elizabeth II in 2013. The others were not. Honor this movie. Honor this man. And honor the movement to bring justice to the other 49,000." Aiding the cause were campaigner Peter Tatchell, Attitude magazine, and other high-profile figures in the gay community.

In February 2015, Matt Damon, Michael Douglas, Jessica Alba, Bryan Cranston, and Anna Wintour among others joined the petition at Pardon49k.org demanding pardons for victims of anti-gay laws. Historians, including Justin Bengry of Birkbeck University of London and Matt Houlbrook of the University of Birmingham, argued that such a pardon would be "bad history" despite its political appeal, because of the broad variety of cases in which the historical laws were applied (including cases of rape) and the distortion of history resulting from an attempt to clean up the wrongdoings of the past post facto. Bengry also cites the existing ability of those convicted under repealed anti-homosexuality laws to have their convictions declared spent.

This petition eventually resulted in the Policing and Crime Act 2017, informally known as the Alan Turing law, which serves as an amnesty law to pardon men who were cautioned or convicted under historical legislation that outlawed homosexual acts, and which was implemented on January 31, 2017. As the law and the disregard process applies only to England and Wales, groups in Northern Ireland and Scotland have campaigned for equivalent laws in their jurisdictions.

== Controversy ==
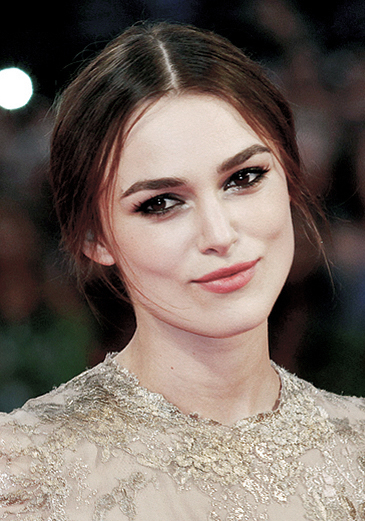
Knightley portrayed code breaker Joan Clarke.

During production, there was criticism regarding the film's purported downplaying of Turing's homosexuality, particularly condemning the portrayal of his relationship with close friend and one-time fiancée Joan Clarke. Hodges, author of the book upon which the film was based, described the script as having "built up the relationship with Joan much more than it actually was". Turing's niece Payne thought that Knightley was inappropriately cast, as she described the real Clarke as "rather plain", and said: "I think they might be trying to romanticize it. It makes me a bit mad. You want the film to show it as it was, not a lot of nonsense."

Speaking to Empire, director Tyldum expressed his decision to take on the project: "It is such a complex story. It was the gay rights element, but also how his (Turing's) ideas were kept secret and how incredibly important his work was during the war, that he was never given credit for it". In an interview for GQ UK, Matthew Goode, who plays fellow cryptographer Hugh Alexander in the film, stated that the script focuses on "Turing's life and how as a nation we celebrated him as being a hero by chemically castrating him because he was gay". The producers of the film stated: "There is not – and never has been – a version of our script where Alan Turing is anything other than homosexual, nor have we included fictitious sex scenes."

In a January 2015 interview with The Huffington Post, its screenwriter Graham Moore said in response to complaints about the film's historical accuracy:

When you use the language of "fact-checking" to talk about a film, I think you're sort of fundamentally misunderstanding how art works. You don't fact check Monet's Water Lilies. That's not what water lilies look like, that's what the sensation of experiencing water lilies feels like. That's the goal of the piece.

In the same interview, Tyldum stated:

A lot of historical films sometimes feel like people reading a Wikipedia page to you onscreen, like just reciting "and then he did that, and then he did that, and then he did this other thing" – it's like a "Greatest Hits" compilation. We wanted the movie to be emotional and passionate. Our goal was to give you "What does Alan Turing feel like?" What does his story feel like? What'd it feel like to be Alan Turing? Can we create the experience of sort of "Alan Turing-ness" for an audience based on his life?

For the most part, Hodges has not commented on the historical accuracy of the film, alluding to contractual obligations involving the film rights to his biography.

== Historical inaccuracies ==
Several events depicted in the film did not happen in real life. The visual blog Information is Beautiful deduced that, while taking creative license into account, the film was just 42.3% accurate when compared to real-life events, summarizing that "shoe-horning the incredible complexity of the Enigma machine and cryptography, in general, was never going to be easy. But this film just rips the historical records to shreds". GCHQ Departmental Historian Tony Comer went even further in his criticism of the film's inaccuracies, saying that "The Imitation Game [only] gets two things absolutely right. There was a Second World War and Turing's first name was Alan".

=== Historical events ===
- The final written epilogue implicitly stating that Turing invented the computer, mentioning that "today, we call 'Turing machines' computers".
  - While Turing is often considered the father of computer science, he did not invent the concept of a computer. Charles Babbage proposed (though never fully built) the first fully programmable digital (though non-electronic) computer. Ada Lovelace worked out how a computer could be programmed. The first functional program-controlled computer, Z3, was invented in 1941 by German civil engineer Konrad Zuse. John von Neumann also contributed substantially to the field. The ENIAC was built upon the work of Turing, but it was not invented by him either. The field of computer science is a cultural practice built upon the work of researchers in many other fields, such as mathematics, linguistics, electronics engineering, mechanical engineering, and cryptography, and the line between a computer and a calculator is relatively blurry. Suggesting that Turing created this field is an oversimplification.
  - The Turing machine is not a literal computer, nor the Enigma-breaking machine specifically, but an abstract mathematical model of one that can effectively generalize completely different computing architectures. Turing proposed it after the invention and popularization of various mechanical computers.
- The naming of the Enigma-breaking machine "Christopher" after Turing's childhood friend, with Turing the only cryptographer working on it while others either did not help or outright opposed it.
  - The electromechanical machine was actually named "Victory" and it was a collaborative, not individual, effort. It was a British Bombe machine, which was partly inspired by a design by the Polish cryptanalyst Marian Rejewski. Rejewski designed a machine in 1938, called bomba kryptologiczna, which had broken an earlier version of Germany's Enigma machines by the Polish Cipher Bureau before the Second World War.
  - A new machine with a different strategy was designed by Turing in 1940 with a major contribution from mathematician Gordon Welchman, who goes unmentioned in the film. His contribution is instead attributed to Hugh Alexander.
- The building of only one machine, with Turing playing a large role in its construction.
  - More than 200 British Bombes were built under the supervision of chief engineer Harold Keen of the British Tabulating Machine Company. Not one of them was built at Bletchley Park.
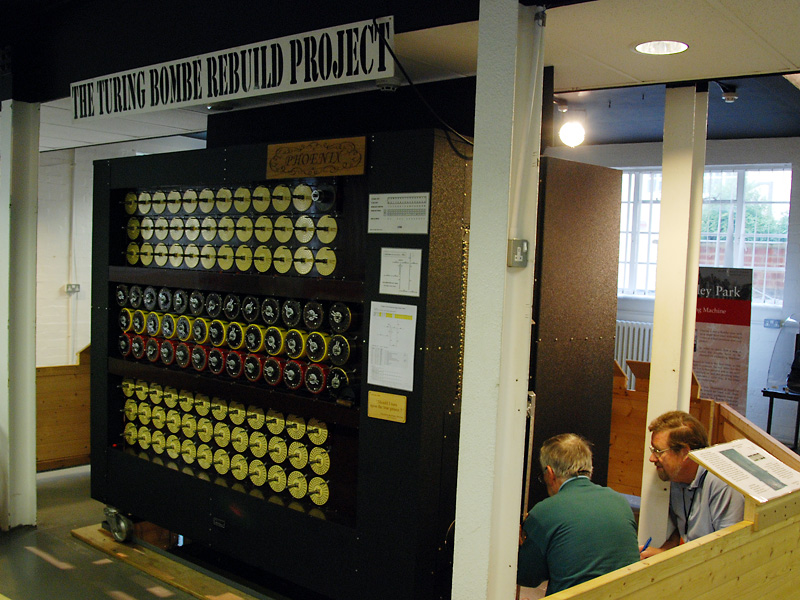
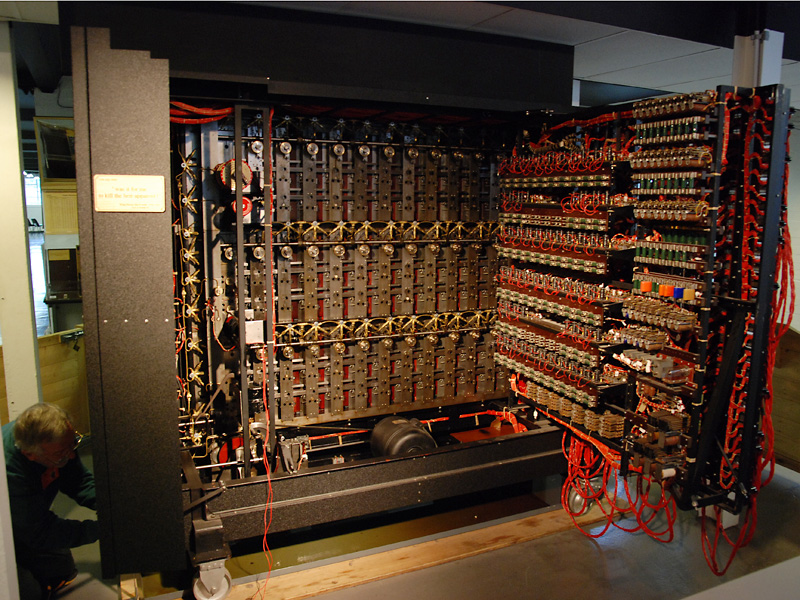
    Turing's rebuilt bombe machine, called Christopher in the film, on display at Bletchley Park Museum
- The overall plot arc in which the British cryptographers were stymied for the first few years of the war and then a sudden breakthrough enabled them to finally break Enigma.
  - In reality, the Polish cryptanalysts Marian Rejewski, Jerzy Różycki and Henryk Zygalski from the Polish Cipher Bureau had been breaking German Enigma messages since 1932. Their effort allowed the Poles to build replicas of German machines in Warsaw for the Polish secret service. Just before the war, the Polish secret service revealed their work to their French and British allies in a secret meeting on July 26 and 27, 1939, in Pyry near Warsaw. Thousands of men and women were working on the project by the time the war ended in 1945. The computing advances did not obviate the need for human labour, as the many teams of largely female operators certainly knew. Throughout the war, there were breakthroughs and setbacks when the design or use of the German Enigma machines was changed and the Bletchley Park code breakers had to adapt.
    The breakthrough depicted in the film gives the impression that the Bombe was developed first, and only became effective later, after Turing suddenly realises that deciphering could be made easier by looking for known or speculated items contained in an intercepted message. In reality, this is a cryptanalysis technique known as employing a crib, and the use of this technique predated the construction of the Bombe and had already been used in manual attacks on Enigma.
- The suggestion that Enigma was the only German cipher broken at Bletchley Park.
  - The breaking of the Lorenz cipher, codenamed "Tunny", arguably made just as important a contribution to Ultra intelligence as the breaking of Enigma, and breaking Tunny was in many ways more difficult. Neither the Tunny effort nor its main contributors, mathematician W. T. "Bill" Tutte and electrical engineer Tommy Flowers, are mentioned in the film. The Colossus computer they built goes unmentioned by name in the film, although there is an implicit suggestion that Turing was responsible for it, which he was not.
- The scene where the Hut 8 team decides not to use broken codes to stop a German raid on a convoy that the brother of one of the code breakers (Peter Hilton) is serving on, to hide the fact they have broken the code.
  - In reality, Hilton had no such brother, and while difficult decisions about when and whether to use data from Ultra intelligence were made, they were decided at much higher administrative levels and not by the codebreakers themselves.
- The sequence in which Turing writes a letter to Churchill to gain control over the project and obtain funding for the decryption machine.
  - Turing was actually not alone in making a different request with a number of colleagues, including Gordon Welchman, Hugh Alexander and Stuart Milner-Barry, writing a letter to Churchill (who had earlier visited there) in an effort to have more administrative resources sent to Bletchley Park, which Churchill immediately did. Milner-Barry hand delivered to 10 Downing Street the letter signed by all four scientists.
- The recruitment of Joan Clarke as a result of an examination after solving a crossword puzzle in a newspaper.
  - In reality, Joan Clarke was an accomplished mathematics student and was recruited by her former academic supervisor, Gordon Welchman, to the Government Code and Cypher School. Puzzles were used by Bletchley Park in recruitment but neither Turing nor Clarke was ever involved with them.

=== Turing's personality and personal life ===
- Turing is depicted as having pronounced idiosyncrasies and challenges that inhibit his social interactions:
  - While researchers have tried to assign a retrospective diagnosis of autism to Turing, the stereotypical traits portrayed in the film, such as social awkwardness, difficulty working with others, and tendency to take things over-literally, bear little relationship to accounts given of Turing's personality, even if he did have other qualities worthy of an informal autism diagnosis. Despite enjoying working alone, Turing was sociable and had friends, was also viewed as having a sense of humour, and had good working relationships with colleagues.
- The scenes depicting Turing's childhood friend, including the manner in which Turing learned of Morcom's illness and death.
- The sequence, which brackets the whole film, in which Turing is arrested in 1951 when a detective suspects him of being a Soviet spy, which leads to the discovery that Turing is gay.
  - Turing's arrest was in 1952. The detective in the film and the interview as portrayed are fictional. Turing was investigated for his homosexuality after a robbery at his house and was never investigated for espionage.
- The suggestion that chemical castration sedated Turing, gave him tardive dyskinesia symptoms, or made him unable to think clearly or do any work.
  - Despite physical weakness and changes in Turing's body including gynaecomastia, at that time he was doing innovative work on mathematical biology, inspired by the very changes his body was undergoing due to chemical castration. While the physical changes distressed Turing, his friends did not notice any meaningful changes to his disposition or comportment in the period between the beginning of his castration and his death.
- The scene in which Clarke visits Turing in his home while he is serving probation.
  - There is no record of Clarke ever visiting Turing's residence during his probation, although Turing did stay in touch with her after the war and informed her of his forthcoming trial for indecency.
- The statement that Turing committed suicide after a year of hormone treatment.
  - In reality, the nature of Turing's death is a matter of considerable debate. The chemical castration period ended 14 months before his death. The official inquest into his death ruled that he had committed suicide by consuming a cyanide-laced apple. Turing biographer Andrew Hodges believes the death was indeed a suicide, re-enacting the poisoned apple from Snow White, Turing's favourite fairy tale, with some deliberate ambiguity included to permit Turing's mother to interpret it as an accident. However, Jack Copeland, an editor of volumes of Turing's work and Director of the Turing Archive for the History of Computing, has suggested that Turing's death may have been accidental, caused by the cyanide fumes produced by an experiment in his spare room, and that the investigation was poorly conducted.

=== Personalities and actions of other characters ===
- The depiction of Commander Denniston as a rigid officer, bound by military thinking and eager to shut down the decryption machine when it fails to deliver results.
  - Denniston's grandchildren stated that the film takes an "unwarranted sideswipe" at their grandfather's memory, showing him to be a "baddy" and a "hectoring character" who hinders the work of Turing. They said their grandfather had a completely different temperament from the one portrayed in the film and was entirely supportive of the work done by cryptographers under his command. There is no record of the film's depicted interactions between Turing and Denniston. Indeed, before the war, Denniston recruited lecturers at Oxford and Cambridge, and Turing, Welchman, and others began working part-time for him then. Turing was always respected and considered one of the best code-breakers at Bletchley Park and in short order took on the role of a leader there.
- All the interactions between Turing and Stewart Menzies, head of the British Secret Intelligence Service.
  - There are no records showing that they interacted at all during Turing's time at Bletchley Park.
- An espionage subplot involving Turing and Soviet spy John Cairncross.
  - Turing and Cairncross worked in different areas of Bletchley Park and there is no evidence they ever met.
- Near the beginning of the film, Hugh Alexander is said to have won the British Chess Championship twice.
  - Although this is true, he won it once in 1938 and the second time in 1956, after the war.

== See also ==
- List of films about mathematicians
