= Action This Day (memo) =

1941 memorandum from Bletchley Park to Winston Churchill

Action This Day was a 1941 memorandum sent to Winston Churchill personally, to advise Churchill that the Bletchley Park (BP) codebreaking establishment was short of staff in some critical areas. Their requirements were small, but as a small (and secret) organisation their management did not have priority. Four senior heads of sections ("Huts") and their deputies wrote to Churchill, who had visited "BP" on 6 September 1941, where he made a speech saying he appreciated their work.

The memo was signed by Alan Turing and Hugh Alexander (head and deputy head of Hut 8); and Gordon Welchman and Stuart Milner-Barry (head and deputy head of Hut 6). The four were known as the "Wicked Uncles".

== Churchill and Bletchley Park ==
Winston Churchill had been interested in military intelligence from the First World War. He called Bletchley Park '"the geese who laid the golden eggs and never cackled". When he became Prime Minister he asked in September 1940 through his personal assistant Desmond Morton to see "all the ENIGMA messages" every day. Even in 1940 this was not possible, and he was sent "Headlines" with a précis plus copies of some messages from Hut 3 and Hut 4 and a sample of diplomatic cable intercepts or "Blue Jackets". They were sent with a note from "C" (Stewart Menzies) each morning in a red box, which was placed on his bed (Menzies) or desk (Morton). He tended to use them "as a stick to beat his generals, rather than acknowledging the often vague and complex intelligence it actually represented". In April 1942 Churchill acknowledged that his figures for Rommel's tank numbers from decrypts only referred to certain areas not to the overall number in North Africa; he had been urging action on Auchinleck. For the next seven months he did not use Western Desert decrypts (although he still wanted to replace Auchinleck with Alexander).

Churchill visited Bletchley Park on 6 September 1941, escorted by Edward Travis. Welchman had been told by Travis to prepare a short speech and started by saying he wanted to make three points. The tour was behind schedule; after Welchman covered two points Travis said "That's enough, Welchman". Churchill (who was enjoying himself) said "I think there was a third point, Welchman" and gave him "a grand schoolboy wink". When Churchill went into Hut 8 his path was blocked by Shaun Wylie and then by Conel Hugh O'Donel Alexander; he was "nonplussed" by the apparent chaos with two senior codebreakers both sitting on the floor and studying papers. John Herivel was introduced as the man beginning the continuous breaking of the vitally important "Red" key; Churchill gave Herivel a "deep penetrating look, not a very friendly look, more of a scowl". Herivel wrote that "it was a miserably dark day with a cold wind. We saw before us a rather frail, oldish looking man, a trifle bowed, with wispy hair, in a black pin-striped suit with a faint red line, no bravado, no large black hat, no cigar. Then he spoke very briefly, but with deep emotion .... That was 'our' finest hour at Bletchley Park".

Then Churchill spoke to the codebreakers from a mound of builder's rubble at the end of Hut 6 in front of the house, saying with deep emotion "how grateful he was to us for all the good work we were doing in the war effort". He said to them "To look at you, one would not think you knew anything secret". Others (e.g. those on late shifts) were very disappointed to miss him. When he was leaving he said to Stewart Menzies or to Alastair Denniston: "I know I said not to leave no stone unturned to get staff, but I didn't expect you to take me literally (or seriously)."

== Content of memo ==
The memo was drafted by Welchman. It detailed three areas where a few extra staff would remove bottlenecks. They said they did not want to be seen as criticising Commander Edward Travis, who had done his utmost to help them.

The memo was headed Secret and Confidential: Prime Minister only, Hut 6 and Hut 8, 21st October 1941. and signed:

We are, Sir, Your obedient servants,
A.M. Turing
W.G. Welchman
C.H.O'D. Alexander
P.S. Milner-Barry

=== Breaking of Naval Enigma (Hut 8) ===
The Hollerith Section under Mr Freeborn had to stop working night shifts because of staff shortages and overworking of his present team. Hence finding of the naval keys was delayed for at least twelve hours every day. He needed at least twenty more untrained Grade III women clerks. There was now also a danger that skilled male staff in his section and with BTM (the British Tabulating Machine Company at Letchworth) would be called up for military service.

=== Military (i.e. Army) and Air Force Enigma (Hut 6) ===
Much wireless traffic in the Middle East, including some with "Light Blue" intelligence, could not be picked up by local intercept stations. Owing to fatigue of the present decoding staff it could not all be decoded, but all that was needed was about twenty trained typists.

=== Bombe testing (Hut 6 and Hut 8) ===
Shortage of WRENS from the Royal Navy had not delayed output from BP, but it meant that Hut 6 & 8 staff needed for other jobs had to do the bombe testing for stories themselves.

== Result ==
Milner-Barry went by train from Bletchley to Euston; there was only a wooden barrier and one policeman at the entrance to Downing Street. He rang the bell of 10 Downing Street and was admitted, saying he had an important secret and confidential letter to deliver in person to the Prime Minister. He gave the memo to George Harvie-Watt, Churchill's Parliamentary Private Secretary, who agreed to show it to Churchill and stress its urgency. (Note: Michael Smith in Station X says Milner-Barry gave the letter to "Brigadier Harvie-Walker, Churchill's principal private secretary", but this is clearly a slip. The same error is reproduced in some other sources.): Milner-Barry had been chosen to deliver the memo as the "most expendable" member of the quartet.

Churchill read it and added his red label ACTION THIS DAY, He gave it to his chief military assistant General Hastings Ismay to action, endorsing it.

"Make sure they have all they want on extreme priority and report to me that this has been done"

Milner-Barry met Alastair Denniston in the corridor some days later, who '"made some wry remark about our unorthodox behaviour, but he was much too nice a man to bear malice". Then Stewart Menzies appeared at BP, he was '"very cross" and personally rebuked Welchman for violating the chain of command.

The situation at BP began to improve, with staff requirements given "extreme priority" and on 18 November Menzies reported to Churchill that "every possible measurement was being taken, and BP's needs were being very rapidly met, although all of the new arrangements were not yet in place". Milner-Barry noticed that "All that we did notice was that almost from that day the rough ways began miraculously to be made smooth". More resources flowed; the Ministry of Labour met Denniston and Menzies to consider favourably the codebreaker's needs. The service chiefs agreed to supply more clever young men, and to expand to the Y service to provide more coverage. Orders for many more bombes were placed with BTM, and a new "bombe" outstation was opened at Gayhurst Manor, north of Bletchley. The Royal Navy supplied more Wrens to run the bombes, who were given their own trade "Special Duties X". Treasury rules that departments requesting extra staff should have a Treasury expert investigate whether existing staff could be used more efficiently were dropped.

== Other Action This Day missives ==
Churchill used his red Action this Day tags to attach to memos that he wished ministers to action immediately, This led his private secretary John Peck to put out a spoof memo with the red tag and with Churchill's forged initials. It fooled several of Churchill's entourage in late 1941: Desmond Morton, Ian Jacob, Eric Seal and Pug Ismay (illustrating the degree of demands which Churchill's staff were used to!):

- Special offices were to be set up for the Prime Minister (to be ready in three day's time) at Selfridge's department store, in the Archbishop's home at Lambeth Palace, at RAF Stanmore, at the London Palladium and in the London suburbs of Tooting Bec and Mile End Road. Each was to have accommodation for Mrs Churchill and Nelson the cat, two shorthand typists, three secretaries, and a place for me to watch air-raids from the roof.

== Sources ==
- Briggs, Asa (2011). Secret Days: Codebreaking in Bletchley Park. London: Frontline Books. ISBN 978-1-84832-615-6.
- Copeland, Jack, ed. (2004). "Letter to Winston Churchill (1941)" (PDF). The Essential Turing: Seminal Writings in Computing, Logic, Philosophy, Artificial Intelligence, and Artificial Life: Plus The Secrets of Enigma. Oxford University Press. ISBN 0-19-825079-7.
- Dunlop, Tessa (2015). The Bletchley Girls: War, Secrecy, Love and Loss. London: Hodder. ISBN 978-1-444-79571-4.
- Gannon, Paul (2006). Colossus: Bletchley Park's Greatest Secret. London: Atlantic Books. ISBN 1-84354-330-3.
- Greenberg, Joel (2017). Alastair Denniston. Yorkshire, UK: Frontline (Pen & Sword). ISBN 978-1-52670-912-7.
- Kenyon, David (2019). Bletchley Park and D-Day: The Untold Story of How the Battle for Normandy Was Won. New Haven and London: Yale University Press. ISBN 978-0-300-24357-4.
- McKay, Sinclair (2010). The Secret Life of Bletchley Park. London: Aurum Press. ISBN 978-1-84513539-3.
- Roberts, Andrew (2018). Churchill: Walking with Destiny. London: Allen Lane (Penguin). ISBN 978-0-241-20563-1.
- Sebag-Montefiore, Hugh (2017) [2000]. Enigma: The Battle for the Code. London: Weidenfeld & Nicolson. ISBN 978-1-4746-0832-9.
- Smith, Michael (1999) [1998], Station X: The Codebreakers of Bletchley Park, Channel 4 Books, ISBN 978-0-7522-2189-2
- Smith, Michael; Erskine, Ralph (2001). Action this Day. London: Bantam Press. ISBN 0593-049101.
- Welchman, Gordon (1982). Breaking the Enigma Codes. London: Allen Lane/Penguin. ISBN 0-7139-1294-4. (published in the US by McGraw-Hill, 1982)
