= Dennis Babbage =

Dennis William Babbage OBE
- Born: 26 April 1909
- Died: 9 June 1991 (aged 82)
- Education: St Paul's School; Magdalene College, Cambridge
- Occupations: Mathematician, cryptanalyst
- Employer: University of Cambridge
- Known for: Bletchley Park codebreaking
- Awards: OBE

Dennis William Babbage OBE (26 April 1909 – 9 June 1991) was an English mathematician associated with Magdalene College, Cambridge, and with codebreaking at Bletchley Park during World War II.

In 1980 Babbage was President of Magdalene College.

== Early life and career ==
He attended St Paul's School, and then Magdalene College from 1927. He wrote 12 papers between 1931 and 1938 on algebraic geometry, and was associated with Professor H. F. Baker. He had a research fellowship in 1933, then a fellowship in 1936. Postwar he was made a tutor in 1946, and a senior tutor in 1964.

He was a distant relative of the 19th century mathematician Charles Babbage, but was not a descendant.

== Bletchley Park ==
During World War II Babbage was the chief cryptanalyst in Hut 6 at Bletchley Park, which decrypted German Army and Air Force Enigma messages. Babbage and Hugh Alexander were leaders in the Machine Room and in all matters related to the techniques of breaking Enigma keys. Babbage was a Major in the Army Intelligence Corps.

Gordon Welchman who was also in Hut 6 wrote that before the war they were "members of a group of geometers known as Professor Baker's 'Tea Party', who met once a week to discuss the areas of research in which we were all interested", and that "I remember his skill on the billiard table, particularly with strokes played behind his back; before the war he had repeatedly beaten me at squash and tennis."

== See also ==
- Canonical bundle
- Enriques–Babbage theorem
