= John R. F. Jeffreys =

British mathematician (1916–1944)

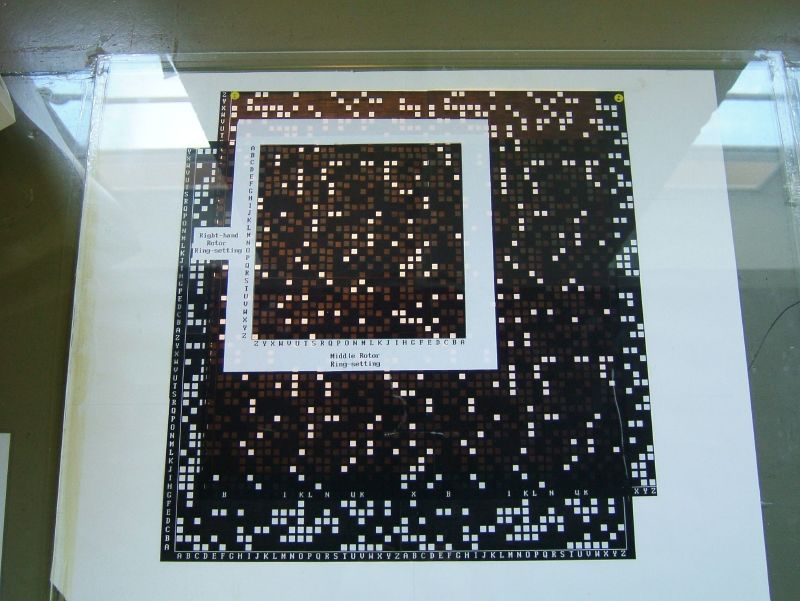
A demonstration of Zygalski sheets, a tool for breaking the Enigma machine. This Polish invention was shared with the British in 1939, and the enormous task of manufacturing two complete sets of the sheets was supervised by Jeffreys.

John Robert Fisher Jeffreys (25 January 1916 – 13 January 1944) was a British mathematician and World War II codebreaker.

Jeffreys was educated at Brentwood School, Essex, and Downing College, Cambridge, where he graduated as a Wrangler in Part II of the mathematics tripos in 1936. Appointed a research fellow at Downing, he joined the codebreaking efforts at Bletchley Park in September 1939 alongside fellow Cambridge mathematicians Gordon Welchman, with whom he had previously worked closely, and Alan Turing. These three, together with Peter Twinn and working under Dilly Knox, formed the research section working on the German Enigma machine, and were housed in "The Cottage" at Bletchley Park.

Jeffreys was put in charge of a small section manufacturing perforated sheets for use in the cryptanalysis of the Enigma, a task which took over three months, completed on 7 January 1940. One type were the Zygalski sheets, known as Netz at Bletchley Park, a technique revealed to the British by Polish cryptologists. Another type, named "Jeffreys sheets", were different, and were a "catalogue of the effect of any two Enigma rotors and the reflector". Jeffreys's perforated sheets were used by Polish cryptologists in exile in France to make the first wartime decryption of an Enigma message on 17 January 1940.

In early 1940, a section called "Hut 6" — named after the building in which it was initially housed — was created to work on solving German Army and Air Force Enigma messages. Jeffreys was chosen to run the hut alongside Welchman. Jeffreys was in charge of "Sheet-Stacking and Machine Room activities", while Welchman handled "Registration, Intercept Control, Decoding, and relations with the intelligence people in Hut 3".

In May 1940, Jeffreys took a vacation, but became ill and was diagnosed with tuberculosis and diabetes. He died in January 1944.

Gordon Welchman later recalled:

Jeffreys was very much liked at Bletchley Park. His death was a tragic loss to all of us. We felt deep sympathy for his fianceé, Pat Hempsted, who had been a member of his team from its beginnings in the Cottage. She was involved both in the initial punching of the sheets and in the testing of drops on which our early breaks depended.

== Sources ==
- Erskine, Ralph; Smith, Michael, eds. (2011), The Bletchley Park Codebreakers, Biteback Publishing Ltd, ISBN 978-1-84954-078-0 Updated and extended version of Action This Day: From Breaking of the Enigma Code to the Birth of the Modern Computer Bantam Press 2001
