= Michael Arbuthnot Ashcroft =

Michael Arbuthnot Ashcroft (1920–1949) was a code breaker at Bletchley Park during the Second World War, working in Hut 8 under Alan Turing.

== Early life ==
Ashcroft was born in 1920 to parents of German descent. He was the fourth child of Frederick Noel Ashcroft, a keen geologist and treasurer for 18 years (1924-1945) and later president of the Royal Geological Society and of Muriel Ashcroft (née im Thurn) the niece of the explorer and colonial governor Sir Everard im Thurn.

He was educated at Bancroft's School and then Eton College where he was a King's Scholar, making his mark as a mathematics specialist and winning various school prizes.

In 1940, he went up to Magdalen College, Oxford, where, as a natural sciences scholar, he became Secretary of the Union in Hilary Term 1941. In June 1941, after only two full terms at Oxford, he was recruited by Conel Hugh O'Donel Alexander to join Hut 8 at Bletchley Park.

== Bletchley Park ==
Ashcroft joined Hut 8 in Bletchley Park in June 1941, two days before Rolf Noskwith, and worked there until mid-1944, when he joined Newmanry working on Tunny. He later worked in the secretariat as assistant to Nigel de Grey.

Within Hut 8, he made his mark and a major contribution to breaking the Atlantic and Mediterranean Naval Enigma "Shark" (or Triton), as the expert on short signals. This expertise was particularly significant during the period December 1942 to June 1943 when, during the blackout that followed the introduction by the Germans of the fourth Enigma wheel, short signals became the route back into Shark (see Enigma in 1942). This work was considerably aided by the capturing of the short signal code books from German submarine U-559 by men from HMS Petard.

After June 1943, Shark was broken on the 4 wheel bombes built by the US equivalent of Bletchley Park – OP – 20 – G.

Ashcroft left Bletchley Park in 1946. Following the end of the war he contributed a chapter on short signals to the Official History of Hut 8.

== Post war study and career ==
In 1946, Ashcroft returned to Magdalen and obtained a first class honors degree in philosophy, politics and economics. He stayed only two terms and left to join the Civil Service. He was assigned to HM Treasury on an accelerated career programme as one of its first post-war administrative recruits. "He undoubtedly found in the Treasury both work and an environment very much to his liking and, had he lived, he would have travelled far. As an administrator he was, for his age, in the first flight, zealous and effective in all things he did, a first class draftsman and a tireless worker."

== Death ==
Ashcroft died from cancer in December 1949, so his civil service career was cut short. He was only 29.

Ashcroft's funeral service took place at St Margaret's, Westminster, on 17 December 1949, attended by Stafford Cripps, then chancellor of the exchequer, and many MPs, colleagues, family and friends.

== Personality ==
Described as "one of the most vigorous and questing minds of his generation", Ashcroft was a great intellect and conversationalist. A very good friend of Roy Jenkins, he was best man at his wedding in 1945. Definitely a Labour Party supporter, he was indifferent to social distinctions and differences of class.
