= Action This Day =

Action This Day may refer to:

- Action This Day (horse), American Champion Thoroughbred racehorse
- Action This Day (song), by Queen
- Action This Day (memo), Churchill's stamp on a famous memo sent to Churchill in 1941; when he required priority for Bletchley Park requirements
- Action This Day; Working With Churchill a memoir by Lord Normanbrook
