= Mair Russell-Jones =

British codebreaker (1917–2013)

- Born: Mair Eluned Thomas; 17 October 1917; Pontycymer, Wales
- Died: 28 December 2013 (aged 96); Wales
- Citizenship: British
- Education: Music, Welsh and German
- Alma mater: Mount Hermon Missionary Training College (1936–1938); Cardiff University (1938–1941)
- Occupation: Codebreaker
- Years active: 1941–1945
- Employer: Foreign Office
- Organization: Government Code and Cypher School
- Notable work: My Secret Life in Hut Six (2014)
- Partner: John Russell-Jones (Russ)
- Parent(s): Thomas and Agnes Thomas
- Relatives: Gethin Russell-Jones (son and co-author)

Mair Russell-Jones (born Mair Eluned Thomas, 17 October 1917 – 28 December 2013) was a graduate in Music and German from Cardiff University who during the Second World War worked as a civilian codebreaker for the Government Code and Cypher School at Bletchley Park. She worked in Hut 6, decrypting messages in Enigma machine cipher.

Having signed the Official Secrets Act, she did not talk about her war work until 1998. Then, with the assistance and co-authorship of her son, Gethin Russell-Jones, she produced a memoir, My Secret Life in Hut Six (Lion Books, Oxford, 2014).

== Book ==
She wrote the book My Secret Life in Hut Six: One woman’s Experience at Bletchley Park that was published in 2014. The book was written by her and her son, she died on the day the book was completed. It was based on her involvement in attempting to break the German Enigma Code. She discusses her experience on working in unconformable conditions, the danger and strain she suffered as a woman during her time at Bletchley Park. Her son, the co-author for this book describes the book as a “ridiculous tale of silence”. The book combines Mair's first hand experiences and feelings about the war and being part of the secret service. It also included her son's and other's opinions who knew her from Bletchley Park or after.

The book indicates that in 1998, Mair was given a copy of The Secrets of Station X by Michael Smith. Station X contains black and white images of the machines, people and buildings, and the room Mair was situated in which was Hut Six, which was known as the Decoding Room. "Station X – known now as Bletchley Park – was the hub of Britain’s code-cracking effort, where hugely talented mathematicians, inventors and 'bright young things' like Mair Russell-Jones worked tirelessly to give the armed forces a crucial helping-hand. As Winston Churchill himself made clear, the accurate information which flowed from Bletchley Park, at a rate which sometimes reached 6,000 messages a day, saved lives and gave Britain a crucial edge in battle."

The book also highlights Mair's love for music and her abilities. It is stated that "her parents are members of local choirs and keen to instill a love of music in their daughters". Furthermore, she claims that "when she was five, she started piano lessons". Her ambition was to become a concert pianist. Her musical abilities came to use during her time at Bletchley Park because her knowledge of music also helped in her ability to see patterns in passages that needed to be decoded. In the book, Mair Russel-Jones states “the freedom to learn and lead was so liberating”. This suggests that women were on equal footing with men and inequalities were not highlighted when it came to the secret service. In a review of Mair's book My Secret Life in Hut Six, and about the women of Bletchley, Christensen claims "At its peak in May 1945, more than 12,000 people worked at Bletchley or its outstations, over 8,000 of them women."

In November 2011, Mair Russell-Jones discussed the war and how it affected her personal life to BBC. She claimed, "I had a boyfriend and a family, and not telling them what I was doing, or even where I was working almost felt as though I was lying to them". This conveys that she was almost living a dual life, as she was sworn to secrecy about all things Bletchley Park. Whenever she was asked what she did, she would reveal that she worked for the Foreign Office in Bletchley.
