= Stephen Banister =

Welsh cricketer

Personal information
- Full name: Stephen Michael Alvin Banister
- Born: 7 October 1918; Llandygai, Caernarfonshire, Wales
- Died: 28 June 2006 (aged 87); Effingham, Surrey, England
- Batting: Right-handed
- Bowling: Right-arm off break

Domestic team information
- Years: Team
- 1938–1939: Cambridge University

Career statistics
Competition	First-class
Matches	6
Runs scored	8
Batting average	2.66
100s/50s	–/–
Top score	4*
Balls bowled	470
Wickets	5
Bowling average	70.00
5 wickets in innings	–
10 wickets in match	–
Best bowling	2/73
Catches/stumpings	2/–
- Source: Cricinfo, 14 September 2020

Stephen Michael Alvin Banister (7 October 1918 – 28 June 2006) was a Welsh first-class cricketer, Bletchley Park codebreaker and civil servant.

Banister was born in October 1918 at Llandygai, Caernarfonshire. His father was an officer in the Indian Civil Service, with Banister spending his early years living in British India at Bombay. He later returned to the United Kingdom when his father took up a post as a research scientist at the University of Cambridge. He was educated at King's College Choir School, before attending Eton College. From Eton he went up to King's College, Cambridge, where he studied classics. While studying at Cambridge, he played first-class cricket for Cambridge University in 1938–39, making six appearances. Playing as a right-arm off break bowler, he took 5 wickets at an expensive bowling average of 70.00 and with best figures of 2 for 73.

Banister was rejected for service with the Royal Air Force during the Second World War, but was recruited shortly after to Bletchley Park, where he worked as a codebreaker in Hut 6. After the war he joined the Civil Service, where he became under-secretary for the Department for Transport. In retirement, he served as secretary to the British and Foreign School Society, and was a member of the National Insurance Tribunal, in addition to serving as a non-executive director of the publishing company Taylor & Francis. Interested in transport, Banister began Transport Reviews in 1981 and was responsible for its first twenty volumes. He spent the latter part of his life living in Effingham, Surrey with his wife, who he had married in 1944 and had four sons. Banister died at Effingham in June 2006.
