= Patrick Alexander (poet) =

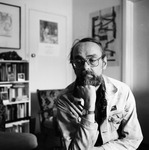

Patrick Macgillicuddy Alexander (20 March 1940 – 21 September 2005) was an Irish-born poet who settled in Australia. Alexander was the son of Hugh Alexander, the Anglo-Irish mathematician famed for his work on the German Enigma machine at Bletchley Park during World War II. Born in Dublin, Dublin (County), Ireland he studied to be an actor at the Royal Academy of Dramatic Arts (RADA) in London and moved to Melbourne, Australia in 1960.

He remained there, except for nine years in Sydney in the late sixties and early seventies. During his time in Sydney, he began submitting to magazines. His publications include Thrown Shadows (1976); five short poems, re-edited as one appeared in Poetry London (London, 1979); Effects of Remembrance (1994); Images Reflections Gathering Tributes(1995), amongst others. He gave several readings of Blake, of the pre-Raphaelites, and of Japanese Poetry in Translation at the National Gallery of Victoria.

Alexander was renowned as a performance poet. He was, from 1983 to 2004, the only artist to produce an event for every Melbourne Fringe Festival. The relationship of the voice and the written word in poetry was an abiding interest for him. In honour of his contribution, the Festival has named the spoken performance prize the Patrick Alexander Memorial Award.

He died in Fitzroy, Victoria. His papers are held by the State Library of Victoria, and include two travel diaries belonging to the writer Una Maud Lyle Smyth.
