= Hut 6 =

Unit of Bletchley Park decryption centre

Coordinates: 51°59′51″N 0°44′32″W

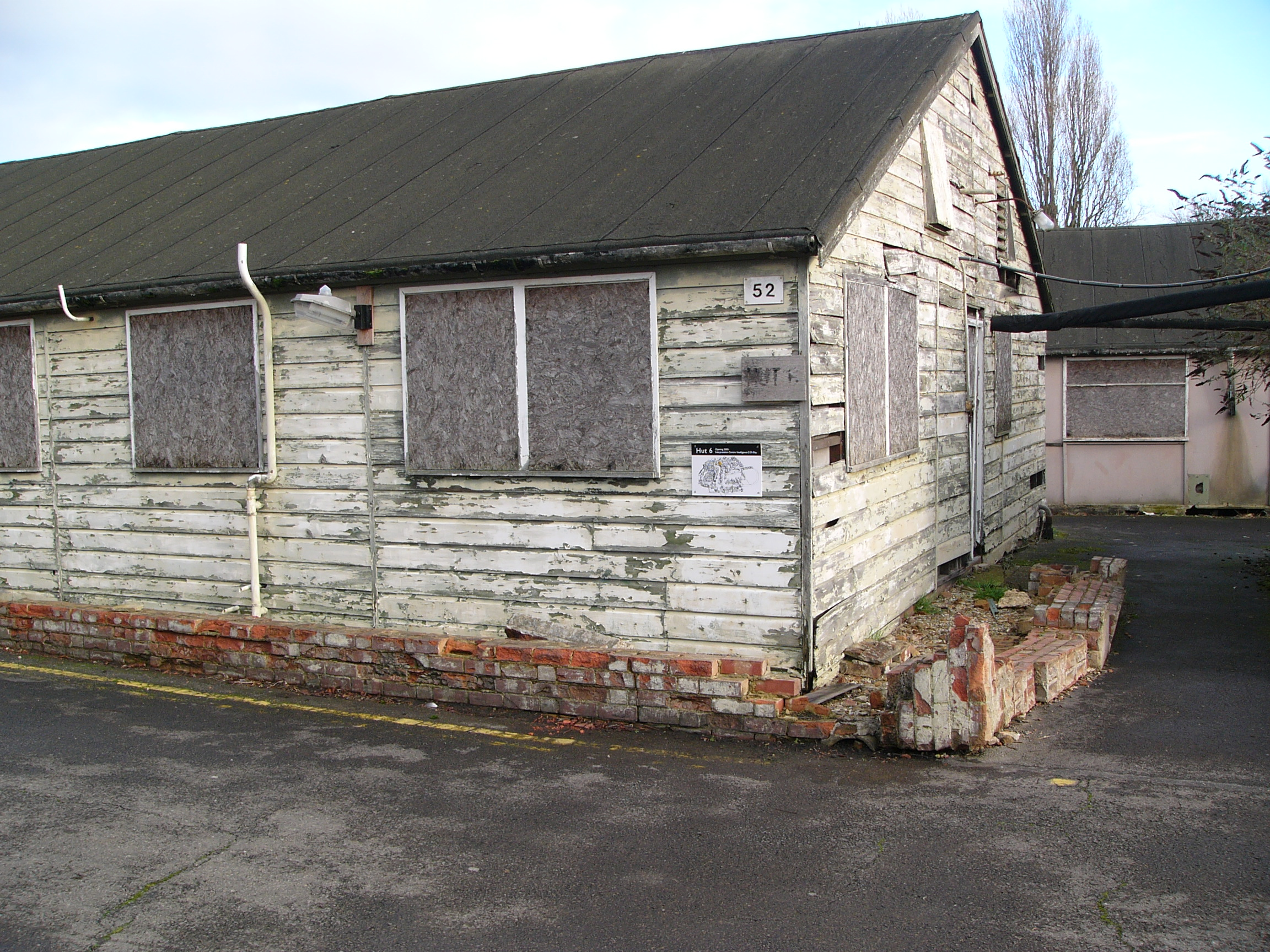
Hut 6 at Bletchley Park in 2004

Hut 6 was a wartime section of the Government Code and Cypher School at Bletchley Park, Buckinghamshire, Britain, to solve German Army and Air Force Enigma machine cyphers. Hut 8, by contrast, attacked Naval Enigma. Hut 6 was established at the initiative of Gordon Welchman, and was run initially by Welchman and fellow Cambridge mathematician John Jeffreys. Welchman's deputy, Stuart Milner-Barry, succeeded Welchman as head of Hut 6 in September 1943, at which point over 450 people were working in the section.

Hut 6 worked with Hut 3, which handled the translation and intelligence analysis of the raw decrypts provided by Hut 6. The Air Force Enigma Processing and Decryption Section was housed in Hut 6 from January 1940 to February 1943 when the Hut was renumbered Hut 16.

== Location ==
Hut 6 was originally named after the building in which the section was located. Welchman says the hut was 20 yd (18 m) long by 10 yd (9.1 m) wide, with two large rooms at the far end – and no toilets. Staff had to go to another building. Irene Young recalled that she "worked in Room 82, though in typical Bletchley fashion there were not eighty-one rooms preceding it". She was glad to move from the Decoding Room "where all the operators were constantly having nervous breakdowns on account of the pace of work and the appalling noise" to the Registration Room which arranged intercepts according to call sign and frequency. As the number of personnel increased, the section moved to more buildings around Bletchley Park, but its name was retained, with each new location also being known as 'Hut 6'. The original building was then renamed 'Hut 16'.

== Personnel ==
John Jeffreys was initially in charge of the Hut with Gordon Welchman until May 1940; Jeffreys was diagnosed ill in 1940 and died in 1944. Welchman became official head of section until autumn 1943, subsequently rising to Assistant Director of Mechanisation at Bletchley Park. Hugh Alexander, was a member from February 1940 to March 1941 before moving to become head of Hut 8. Stuart Milner-Barry joined early 1940 and was in charge from autumn 1943 to the end of the war.

One code breaker concerned with cryptanalysis of the Enigma, John Herivel, discovered what was soon dubbed the Herivel tip or Herivelismus. For a few months from May 1940, the "tip", in conjunction with operating shortcomings or "cillies", were the main techniques used to solve Enigma. The "tip" was an insight into the habits of the German machine operators allowing Hut 6 to easily deduce part of the daily key. David Rees is credited with the first decode using the Herivel tip.

In 1942, Welchman recruited fellow Old Marlburians, Bob Roseveare and Nigel Forward. Roseveare started in the Watch working on Luftwaffe messages before moving to the Quatch, a small backroom group that decoded non-current messages. In Hut 6 were the Machine Room, plus the Decoding Room and Registration Room with mainly female staff under Harold Fletcher, a school and university friend of Gordon Welchman. In 2014 one of these female staff, Mair Russell-Jones, published a posthumous memoir of her work there.

Other notable individuals were,

- Alexander Aitken, New Zealand and Scottish mathematician
- James Macrae Aitken, Scottish chess player
- Madge E. Allen
- Dennis Babbage
- Stephen Banister, Welsh cricketer and civil servant
- Clarence Barasch, American observer to British Intelligence
- Asa Briggs, English historian
- June Canney, Registration Room later Welchman's secretary
- John Coleman and George Crawford, Intercept Control Room
- Sheila Dunlop (later Lady Killanin)
- Harold Fletcher, administrator
- Edna Garbutt, member of A Watch
- John Herivel, creator of the "Herivel tip"
- Jane Hughes, later Jane Hughes Fawcett, who decoded the message that led to the sinking of the German battleship Bismarck
- Ione Jay (Ione Roseveare) wrote an account of her experiences there
- Oliver Lawn, married 1948 Sheila who worked elsewhere at BP, Scottish country dancer.
- Reginald H. Parker (Reg), discoverer of "Parkerismus", in Hut 6 Intercept Control Room
- David Rees, University of Exeter mathematics professor
- Helen C. Stanley-Baker, Oxford mathematics student
- Derek Taunt, Cambridge research student
- Ann Katharine Mitchell (née Williamson), Oxford mathematics graduate
- Irene Young, University of Edinburgh, Decoding Room then Registration Room

== See also ==
- Action This Day (memo)
- Bombe
- Cryptanalysis of the Enigma
- Hut 8
- Bletchley
- Milton Keynes

== Sources ==
- Briggs, Asa (2011). Secret Days: Codebreaking in Bletchley Park. London: Frontline Books. ISBN 978-1-84832-615-6.
- Stuart Milner-Barry, "Hut 6: Early days", pp. 89–99 in Codebreakers: The Inside Story of Bletchley Park, edited by F. H. Hinsley, and Alan Stripp, Oxford University Press, 2003
- Russell-Jones, Mair and Gethin (2014). My Secret Life in Hut Six: One woman's experiences at Bletchley Park. Oxford: Lion Hudson. ISBN 978-0-7459-5664-0.
- Derek Taunt, "Hut 6: 1941-1945", pp. 100–112 in Codebreakers: The Inside Story of Bletchley Park, edited by F. H. Hinsley, and Alan Stripp, Oxford University Press, 2003
- Welchman, Gordon (1982). The Hut Six Story: Breaking the Enigma Codes. London & New York: Allen Lane & McGraw-Hill. ISBN 0-7139-1294-4.
- Gordon Welchman, The Hut Six Story: Breaking the Enigma Codes (1997: Cleobury Mortimer, Baldwin) ISBN 978-0-947712-34-1
- Irene Young, Enigma Variations: A Memoir of Love and War (1990, Mainstream Publishing, Edinburgh) ISBN 1-85158-294-0
- Alan Turing, Gordon Welchman, Hugh Alexander, Stuart Milner-Barry. Letter (memo) to Winston Churchill (1941)
