= Alda Milner-Barry =

British cryptoanalyst and academic (1893-1938)

- Born: 5 July 1893
- Died: 26 March 1938 (aged 44); Cambridgeshire, England
- Occupations: Educator, codebreaker
- Relatives: Stuart Milner-Barry (brother); W. H. Besant (grandfather)

Alda Mary Milner-Barry (5 July 1893 – 26 March 1938) was a British cryptoanalyst and academic. She was a fellow and vice-principal of Newnham College, Cambridge, and part of MI1b, the British military intelligence unit of the War Office in World War I.

== Personal life ==
Alda Milner-Barry was born in 1893, the daughter of Edward Leopold Milner-Barry, Professor of Modern Languages at the University of Bangor, and his wife Edith Mary Milner-Barry (née Besant). Her grandfather was William H. Besant, a mathematical fellow of St John's College, Cambridge. Her aunt Alda Marguerite Milner-Barry was an author, lecturer, and hymnwriter. Her younger brother, Stuart Milner-Barry, was a renowned chess player and would become a codebreaker at Bletchley Park during World War II.

== Career ==
While an undergraduate at Newnham College, Cambridge, (1912-1914) Alda Milner-Barry covered her father's lessons at the University of Bangor while he was working as a translator in the British Admiralty. She completed the Medieval and Modern Languages tripos at Cambridge in two years, instead of the usual three, in 1914. In 1916, she graduated with first class honours in English and German. She immediately took up work as a translator in the Intelligence Department of the War Office. In around 1917, Milner-Barry was the interim Professor of German at University College Galway for a year. She then went to MI1b, where she was appointed deputy to codebreaker Emily Anderson.

From 1920 to 1934, she was a lecturer in English at the University of Birmingham and, from 1934 to 1938, the tutor of Sidgwick Hall, Newnham College. She became vice-principal of the college, remaining in that position until her death in 1938, at the age of 44, at a nursing home in Cambridgeshire.

== Publications ==
- Milner-Barry, Alda (1926). "A Note on the Early Literary Relations of Oliver Goldsmith and Thomas Percy". The Review of English Studies. 2 (5): 51–61. doi:10.1093/res/os-II.5.51. ISSN 0034-6551. JSTOR 507645.
- Milner-Barry, Alda (1927). "Review of The History and Sources of Percy's Memoir of Goldsmith". The Review of English Studies. 3 (10): 232–234. doi:10.1093/res/os-III.10.232. ISSN 0034-6551. JSTOR 508289.
