= A. J. Alan =

English radio broadcaster (1883–1941)

A.J. Alan
- Born: Leslie Harrison Lambert; 11 November 1883; Nottingham, England
- Died: 13 December 1941 (aged 58); Norwich, England
- Occupations: Magician, intelligence officer, author, radio broadcaster

Leslie Harrison Lambert (11 November 1883 – 13 December 1941), known in public as A. J. Alan, was an English magician, intelligence officer, short story writer and radio broadcaster. At the beginning of World War II he worked in naval intelligence at Bletchley Park.

== Life and career ==
Lambert, son of Thomas Harrison Lambert and his wife Kate, was born in Nottingham and went to Rugby School before training to be a surveyor. He then learned to be a magician and became a successful member of The Magic Circle, performing especially at society events.

Lambert became a radio ham and at the start of World War I he volunteered to work at a coastguard station in Norfolk which was a centre for intercepting German radio transmissions. By November 1914 he was employed by the Admiralty at Naval Intelligence Room 40 although even until after his death official records said he had been working at the Foreign Office since 1909. In 1919 the staff at Room 40 became part of the new Government Code and Cypher School and Lambert was still working there at the outbreak of World War II. He was one of the many people from GC&CS transferred to Bletchley Park by which time he was an important official in naval military intelligence. At Bletchley Park he was in Hut 8 and he was known to R V Jones who said that "in contrast to his outrageously unconventional stories" that he led his life on "a monotonously regular timetable".

Lambert married but had no children. He lived at Holland Park, London and had a second home at Potter Heigham for sailing his boat on the Norfolk Broads. He was an amateur radio operator using call sign G2ST and an authority on food and wine.

== Radio broadcaster ==
Lambert contacted a member of the then British Broadcasting Company to suggest he might tell one of his own short stories on the radio. This was accepted and so, as A. J. Alan, he broadcast My Adventure in Jermyn Street, on 31 January 1924. Following his immediate success, he quickly became one of the most popular broadcasting personalities of the time. He went to considerable trouble over writing each story, taking a couple of months over each one, and only broadcasting about five times a year. He carefully constructed an apparently extempore, conversational, style making his stories seem like anecdotes concerning strange events that had happened to him. The endings were whimsical and unexpected.

Contrary to the common belief that his stories were told "off the cuff", Lambert took immense care over his broadcasts which were, of course, live. He used cards rather than papers to avoid rustling noises and kept a candle lit in case the lights failed. He always wore a dinner jacket and Stuart Hibberd described him as "a neat figure in perfectly cut evening dress, with eye glass and a slim black brief case".

It was known that "A. J. Alan" was not his true name but only once, in 1933, was his identity guessed when an old school friend, by then living in Jamaica, recognised his voice. Many of his stories were subsequently printed in newspapers and magazines and were included in anthologies of short stories. Three collections of his stories have been published.

From 1937 his health was not good so he reduced his radio work and made his last broadcast on 21 March 1940.

== Publications ==
=== Books of stories ===
- Good Evening, Everyone!, Hutchinson (1928)
- A.J. Alan's Second Book, Hutchinson (1933)
- The Best of A.J. Alan (edited by Kenelm Foss), Richards Press (1954)

=== Recordings ===
- Percy the Prawn, Regal Zonophone MR1118 (1933)
- Hilarion the Fish / The Origin of the Horse Marines, Regal Zonophone MR991 (1933)
