= Joel Greenberg (historian) =

British historian

Joel Greenberg (born 1946) is an educational technology consultant and historian on the role of Bletchley Park in World War II.

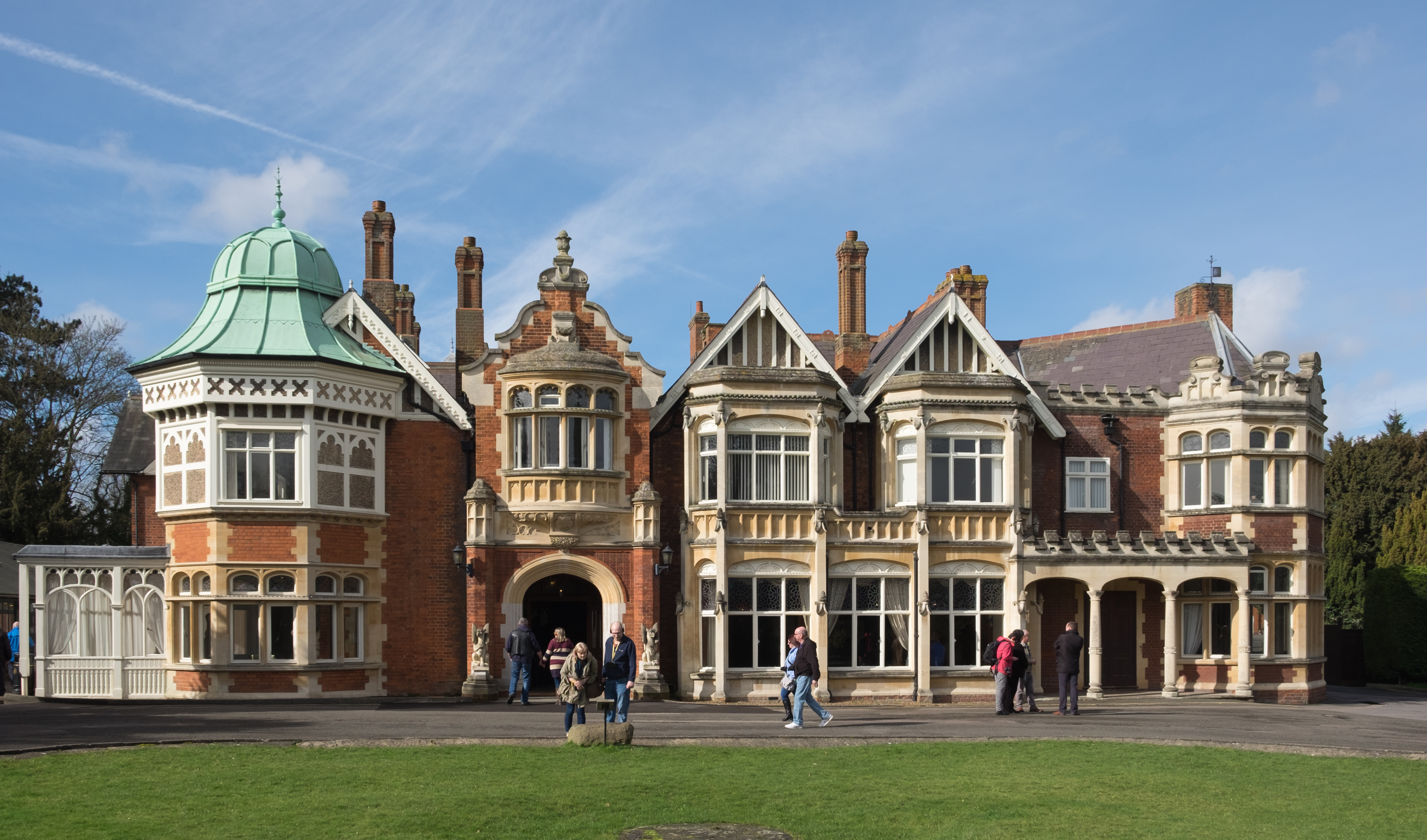
The mansion at Bletchley Park, where Joel Greenberg studies its history and conducts tours

Greenberg gained a PhD degree in numerical mathematics from the University of Manchester (UMIST) in 1973. For over 33 years, he worked for the Open University and held a number of director-level management positions. He lectures and writes about Bletchley Park and its role in World War II. He also conducts tours of the site. He is author of biographies about Gordon Welchman, a key figure at Bletchley Park during WWII, and Alastair Denniston, the first operational head of GCHQ. In 2017, he contributed a chapter to The Turing Guide on the German WWII Enigma machine.

== Books ==
- Greenberg, Joel (2017). Gordon Welchman: Bletchley Park's Architect of Ultra Intelligence. Frontline Books. ISBN 978-1473885257.
- Greenberg, Joel (2017). Alastair Denniston: Code-breaking From Room 40 to Berkeley Street and the Birth of GCHQ. Frontline Books. ISBN 978-1526709127.
