= Enriques–Babbage theorem =

Algebraic geometric theorem

In algebraic geometry, the Enriques–Babbage theorem states that a canonical curve is either a set-theoretic intersection of quadrics, or trigonal, or a plane quintic. It was proved by Babbage (1939) and Enriques (1919).
