= Gordon Welchman =

English cryptanalyst and mathematician (1906–1985)

Gordon Welchman OBE
- Born: 15 June 1906; Fishponds, Bristol, England
- Died: 8 October 1985 (aged 79); Newburyport, Massachusetts, US
- Occupations: Mathematician, codebreaker

William Gordon Welchman (15 June 1906 – 8 October 1985) was an English mathematician. During World War II, he worked at Britain's secret decryption centre at Bletchley Park, where he was one of the most important contributors. In 1948, after the war, he moved to the US and later worked on the design of military communications systems.

== Early life, education and career ==
Gordon Welchman was born the youngest of three children in Fishponds, Bristol, to William Welchman (1866–1954) and Elizabeth Marshall Griffith. William was a Church of England priest who had been a missionary overseas before returning to England as a country vicar, eventually becoming archdeacon of Bristol. Elizabeth was the daughter of another priest, the Revd Edward Moule Griffith.

Welchman was educated at Marlborough College and then studied mathematics at Trinity College, Cambridge, from 1925 to 1928. In 1929, he became a research fellow in mathematics at Sidney Sussex College, Cambridge. He became a fellow in 1932 and later dean of the College.

== Bletchley Park ==
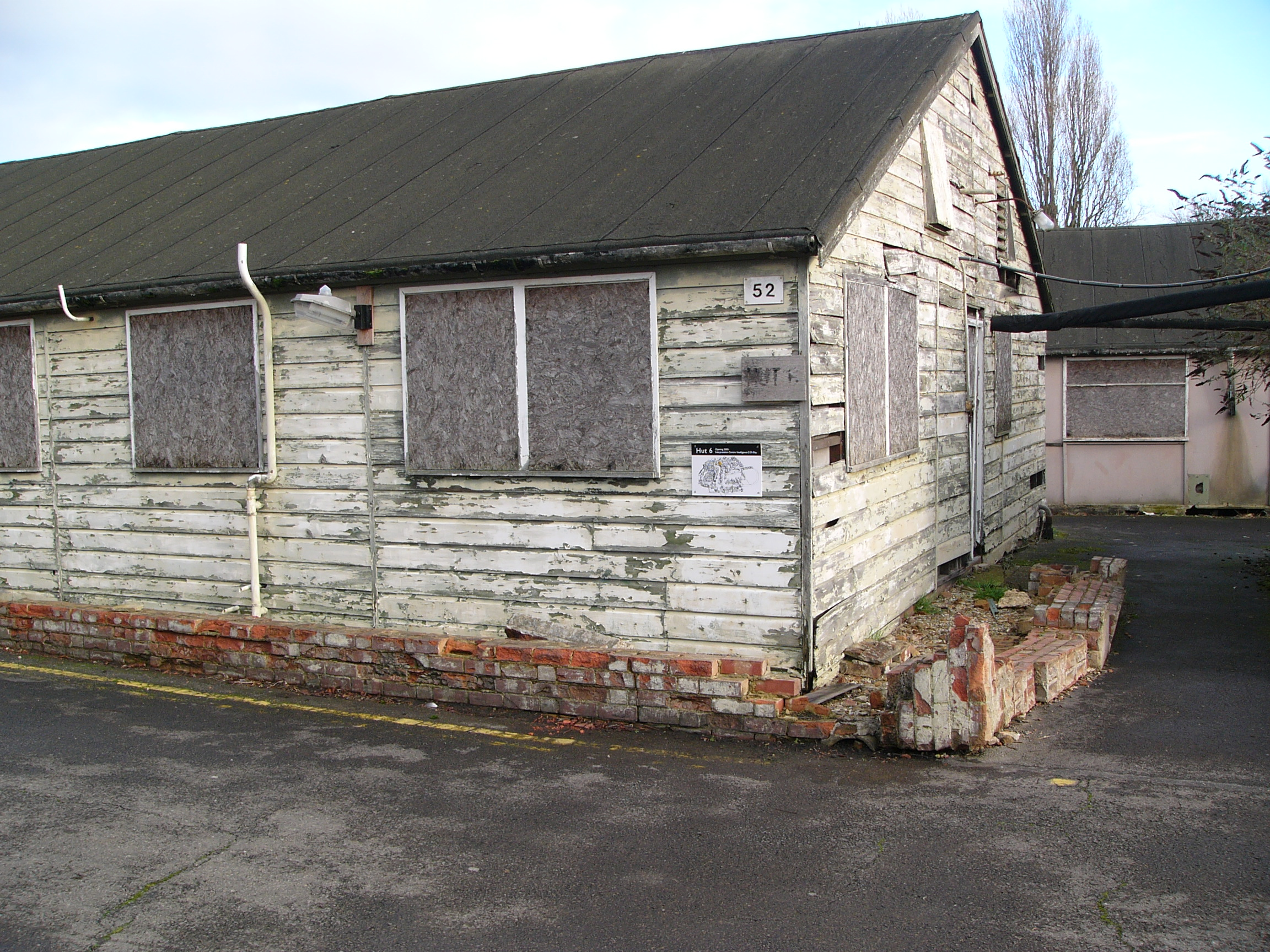
Hut 6 at Bletchley Park in 2004 (since restored)

Just before World War II, Welchman was invited by Commander Alastair Denniston to join the Government Code and Cypher School in the event of war. GCCS established a centre ("Station X") for decryption and analysis of enemy (mostly German) encrypted messages at Bletchley Park (BP). Welchman was one of four early recruits to Bletchley, the others being Alan Turing, Hugh Alexander and Stuart Milner-Barry. They all made significant contributions at Bletchley and became known as "the wicked uncles". They were also the four signatories to a letter to Winston Churchill in October 1941, asking for more resources for the code-breaking work. Churchill responded with one of his "Action This Day" memoranda.

Much of Welchman's work at Bletchley was in "traffic analysis" of encrypted German communications. This was the collection and analysis of data about which enemy units sent and received messages, including where and when. Such metadata analysis can reveal a lot about enemy organisation, movements and activities, even when the content of the messages remains unknown. Welchman is credited with developing this technique.

However, Welchman's main contributions were to the process of breaking the German Enigma machine cipher (cryptanalysis of the Enigma). Welchman became head of Hut Six, the section at BP responsible for breaking German Army and Air Force Enigma ciphers.

Polish cryptanalysts had developed the bomba, an electromechanical device for finding the Enigma settings used by German operators; Turing improved the Polish design. Welchman invented the "Diagonal Board", an addition which made the British Bombe immensely more powerful.

The Diagonal Board exploited the self-reciprocity of the plugboard element of the Enigma; that is, if on the plugboard, letter B is Steckered (plugged) to letter G, then G is also Steckered to B. If 26 rows of 26 way connectors are stacked up, then any connection point can be referenced by its row letter and column letter. A physical piece of wire can now connect (row B element G) to (row G element B.) Each such wire runs diagonally across the board; thus its name.

The Diagonal Board enabled the bombe to solve the Enigma plugboard setting separately from the wheel setting. This reduced the time required to find the complete setting from days to hours.

As head of Hut Six, Welchman was also closely involved in other work which yielded breaks into Enigma by taking advantage of German operational weaknesses and lapses. These were quite extensive, and Welchman's experience in this area informed his later work on making communications secure. His team of young women included Ethel Houston, who would later become the first woman to be made senior partner at a Scottish law firm.

Welchman left Hut Six in 1943, to become Assistant Director for Mechanisation. His responsibilities in this post included the construction, deployment, and operation of additional bombes. By the end of the war, hundreds of bombes were in use at BP and satellite locations. Welchman had responsibility for cryptographic liaison with the US, which constructed and used additional bombes. He was responsible for making sure that the British and American bombes were not wastefully working on the same keys, and that all solutions by one group were reported to the other group.

His main interest at this time was the development of similar machines for attacking more advanced German ciphers, such as the Geheimschreiber. Welchman was sent to America on the Queen Mary in February 1944, and was allocated to the “captain’s table” along with the film producer Alexander Korda and a British cabinet minister, who seemed to resent his presence at the top table as he “didn’t seem to be doing anything important.” When they reached New York and a broadcast announcement was made “Will Mr Alexander Korda and Mr Gordon Welchman please disembark”, Welchman saw the “look of amazement” on the minister’s face.

Welchman was awarded the OBE in the 1944 King's Birthday Honours list. The London Gazette described him as "William Gordon Welchman, Esq., Employed in a Department of the Foreign Office".

== Postwar ==
After the end of the war Welchman took up Hugh Alexander's old post as director of research for the John Lewis Partnership. In 1948, he moved to the United States. Welchman taught the first computer programming course at the Massachusetts Institute of Technology in 1951, and Frank Heart was among his students. He followed this by employment with Remington Rand and Ferranti. Welchman became a naturalised US citizen in 1962. In that year, he joined the Mitre Corporation, working on secure communications systems for the US military. He retired in 1971, but was retained as a consultant.

In 1982 his book The Hut Six Story was published, initially by McGraw-Hill in the US and by Allen Lane in Britain. The National Security Agency disapproved. The book was not banned, but as a result of it, Welchman lost his American and British security clearances, and therefore his consultancy with Mitre, and was forbidden to discuss either the book or his wartime work. The impact on Welchman of withdrawal of his security clearance by the NSA has been described as "devastating".

Welchman died from cancer in 1985; his final conclusions and corrections to the story of wartime code breaking were published posthumously in 1986 in the paper "From Polish Bomba to British Bombe: the birth of Ultra" in Intelligence & National Security, Vol 1, No l. The paper was included in the revised edition of The Hut Six Story published in 1997 by M & M Baldwin.

== Personal life ==
In 1937 Welchman married Katharine Hodgson, a professional musician. The couple had a son and two daughters.

In 1959 Welchman divorced Katharine and married the American Cubist painter Fannie Hillsmith. The marriage lasted until 1970.

In 1972 he married Elisabeth Huber, daughter of Welchman's second cousin.

== Legacy ==
Gordon Welchman was the subject of a BBC documentary in 2015. The programme was entitled Bletchley Park: Code-breaking's Forgotten Genius and as The Codebreaker Who Hacked Hitler when broadcast on the Smithsonian Channel in the US. The documentary notes that traffic analysis now includes "network analysis" and "metadata" analysis, and gives as an example the locating of Osama bin Laden by the use of network theory.

On 26 September 2016, a blue plaque was unveiled by his daughter, Susanna Griffiths, at St Mary's Church, Fishponds, in Bristol. Speaking at the event, the Director of GCHQ Robert Hannigan acknowledged the harsh treatment of Welchman, and paid tribute to his "immense contribution" as a "giant of his era".

== See also ==
- History of cryptography
- Peter Calvocoressi
- Hut 6
- Action This Day (memo)

== Works ==
- —— (1950). Introduction to Algebraic Geometry. Cambridge University Press. ISBN 978-1316-6018-08.
- —— (1982). The Hut Six Story: Breaking the Enigma Codes (1st ed.). McGraw-Hill. ISBN 9780070691803. It was the publication of this book that first exposed to the public the secret of the breaking of the Third Reich's message encryption.
- W. Gordon Welchman. From Polish Bomba to British Bombe: The birth of ULTRA 1986 Intelligence and National Security Volume 1, Issue 1; doi:10.1080/02684527.2016.1253221
- —— (1997). The Hut Six Story: Breaking the Enigma Codes (2nd Revised ed.). M.& M. Baldwin. ISBN 978-0947712341.
- W. Gordon Welchman. Ultra revisited, a tale of two contributors 2017 Intelligence and National Security Volume 32, Issue 2 doi:10.1080/02684527.2016.1253221
- W. Gordon Welchman. How I came to write The Hut Six Story 2018 Intelligence and National Security Volume 33, Issue 1. (Edited with an introduction by Joel Greenberg doi:10.1080/02684527.2017.1303222

== Sources ==
- Russell-Jones, Mair (2014), My Secret Life in Hut Six: One Woman's Experiences at Bletchley Park, Lion Hudson, ISBN 978-0-745-95664-0
- West, Nigel (1986). The Sigint Secrets: The Signals Intelligence War, 1900 to Today–Including the Persecution of Gordon Welchman. New York: William Morrow and Company. ISBN 0-688-07652-1. LCCN 88-43153.
