= Ralph Erskine =

Ralph Erskine may refer to:

- Ralph Erskine (architect) (1914–2005), British-Swedish architect
- Ralph Erskine (historian) (1930–2021), Northern Ireland government lawyer and historian of wartime codebreaking
- Ralph Erskine (minister) (1685–1752), Scottish clergyman
