= Whaddon, Buckinghamshire =

Village and civil parish in England

Coordinates: 52.000°N 0.828°W

Whaddon
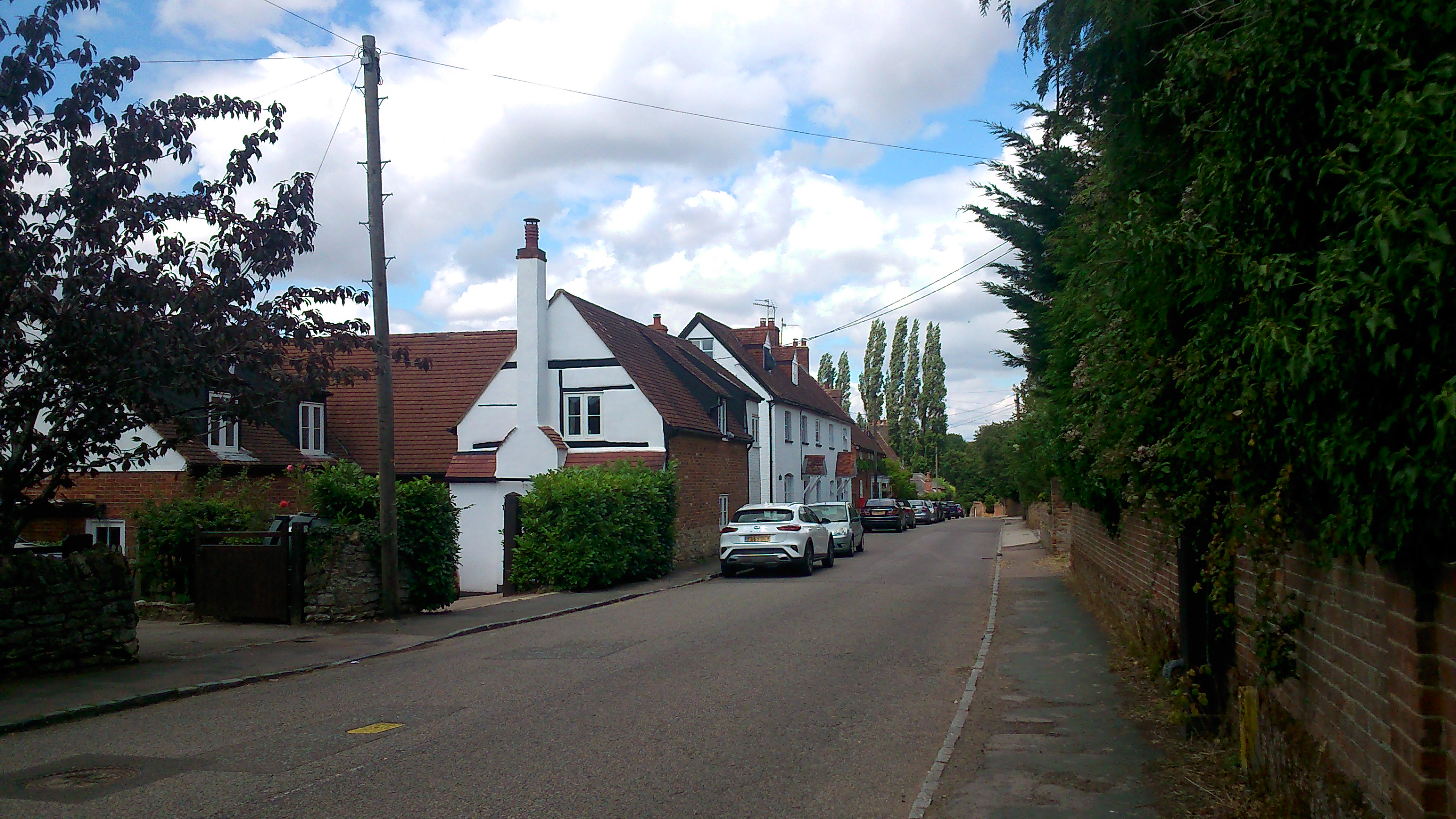
- Whaddon, 2020

- Location within Buckinghamshire
- Interactive map of Whaddon
- Population: 533 (2011 Census)
- OS grid reference: SP805340
- Civil parish: Whaddon
- Unitary authority: Buckinghamshire Council
- Ceremonial county: Buckinghamshire
- Region: South East
- Country: England
- Sovereign state: United Kingdom
- Post town: MILTON KEYNES
- Postcode district: MK17
- Dialling code: 01908
- Police: Thames Valley
- Fire: Buckinghamshire
- Ambulance: South Central
- UK Parliament: Buckingham and Bletchley

Whaddon is a village and civil parish in Buckinghamshire, England. It is situated just outside of Bletchley, a constituent town of Milton Keynes.

The village name is Anglo Saxon in origin, and means 'hill where wheat is grown'. The village is referred to several times in the Anglo-Saxon Chronicle, generally in the form of Hwætædun.

The village is at the centre of the ancient Whaddon Chase, the site for many centuries of royal hunting lands. Whaddon Chase is designated an area of 'Special Landscape Interest'.

The Church of St Mary is a grade I listed building.

Whaddon Church of England School is a mixed primary school. It is voluntary controlled, and takes children from ages four to eleven. It has approximately 50 pupils.

Richard Cox (c. 1500–1581), an English clergyman, who was Dean of Westminster and Bishop of Ely, was born at Whaddon.

Whaddon Hall, the village manor, was once home to the Selby family (also known as Selby-Lowndes), whose ancestor William Lowndes built the larger and grander Winslow Hall. Both mansions are still private houses. During the Second World War, Whaddon Hall served as headquarters of Section VIII (Communications) of MI6, as an outpost of Bletchley Park.
