= National College of Cyber Security =

Coordinates: 51°59′57″N 0°44′27″W

- Key people: Alastair MacWillson

The College of National Security (also referred to as the National College of Cyber Security) was a proposed cyber security school for 16-19 year-olds, scheduled to open in September 2020 at Bletchley Park.

== Founding ==
The initiative to create the school emerged from Qufaro, a nonprofit organisation created by representatives of Raytheon, BT Security and the Institute of Information Security Professionals.

The college was to be located in Block G of Bletchley Park which was being renovated in 2017 with funding by the Bletchley Park Science and Innovation Centre. Bletchley Park Trust had no involvement in the cyber security college.

The opening of the college, originally planned for 2016, was pushed back to 2020 as the application to open as a college in the Department for Education's Free Schools program had yet to be granted. However, in April 2020 Bletchley Park Capital Partners (a private company run by Tim Reynolds) announced plans to sell off the freehold to the site for commercial development. Offers of between £4m and £6m were reportedly being sought for the three acre plot, for which planning permission for employment purposes had been granted in 2005.
