= Ralph Erskine (historian) =

Lawyer and historian (1933–2021)

- Born: 14 October 1933
- Died: 9 April 2021 (aged 87)
- Occupation: First Legislative Counsel

Thomas Ralph Erskine CB (14 October 1933 – 9 April 2021) was a senior Northern Ireland government lawyer and historian of wartime codebreaking.

== Biography ==
=== Family and early life ===
His parents were Robert Todd Erskine, a businessman from Belfast, and Mary Edith Erskine (née Motherwell). He had three siblings, one of whom died in childhood.

=== Education ===
In 1941 he went to Portora Royal School as a boarder and in September 1947 went to Campbell College.

In his teens he contracted tuberculosis and spent a year and a half in the hospital. He later said he considered himself lucky as many in his ward didn't survive. The illness had an impact on his life - running for the bus was something he couldn't do until his late twenties.

=== Legal career ===
Ralph Erskine studied law at Queen's University Belfast and was called to the Bar at Gray's Inn in February 1962. He never practised law, instead taking a post as a government lawyer initially with the Home Office and from 1957 until 1992 with the Northern Ireland government where he was responsible for drafting legislation for Northern Ireland. He was First Legislative Counsel for the Northern Ireland government from 1972 to 1992 and the lead person responsible for the complex legislation required to deal with the period of inter-communal violence known as The Troubles. His work included the drafting of legislation for the first Northern Ireland Assembly in 1973 and the 1986 Anglo-Irish Agreement, for which he was appointed Commander of the Order of the Bath. His experience was sought after not just in retirement by his former colleagues but by legislative counsel in a number of Commonwealth countries and in Hong Kong, where it was invaluable to those drafting the legislation which turned the territory's legislative council into a fully elected assembly ahead of the 1997 handover to China.

In 1989 he was warned by the Royal Ulster Constabulary that a member of the Provisional IRA had been seen conducting reconnaissance of their home. The family was escorted to a safe house and couldn't share contact details with their friends and family until 1996. Their official postal address during this time was the post office at Stormont.

=== Historian ===
His legislative work was subsequently overshadowed by his work on the British codebreaking operations at Bletchley Park during the Second World War, on which he was arguably the world's leading historian. He wrote more than 70 essays on the subject in academic journals or in chapters for books edited by other historians and was co-editor, with Michael Smith, of the book Action This Day which was described by Whitfield Diffie in the Times Higher Education Supplement as a "remarkable collection of essays. Leaves one in awe of the complexity of Bletchley Park and its impact on both the world war and our postwar world". Louis Kruh, editor of the academic journal Cryptologia, hailed it as “absolutely the best book ever written about code-breaking at Bletchley Park”. It was republished in 2011 as The Bletchley Park Codebreakers, with all the royalties going to the Bletchley Park Trust.

In 2000, Erskine became a visiting research scholar with the Bletchley Park Trust alongside Frode Weierud and David Hamer. In 2002, he was awarded the Gauss Lectureship from the German Mathematical Society. He was a member of the Historical Advisory Group of the Bletchley Park Trust. He was also involved with the Crypto Simulation Group. In his book The Secret War, the military historian Sir Max Hastings said: "My obligation is immense to Ralph Erskine, a fount of information about every aspect of wartime code-breaking, which is both a maze and a minefield for the uninitiated." After hearing of Erskine's death, Hastings added: "Every historian of the Second World War and student of cryptology owes him a debt for his extraordinary contribution to the scholarship." Hugh Sebag-Montefiore called him "the greatest expert on the Enigma-M4", which was the Enigma cipher system used by the German Navy from February 1942 to the end of the war.

Ralph Erskine died on 9 April 2021.

== Publications ==
- Naval Enigma M4 and its rotors (1987)
- The Development of Typex (1997)
- First naval Enigma decrypts of World War 2 (1997)
- The Kenngruppenbuch indicator system
- The breaking of Heimisch and Triton (1998)
- Kriegsmarine short signal system –and how Bletchley Park exploited them (1999)
- The Admiralty and cipher machines during the Second World War – Not so stupid after all (2002)
- Erprobung, Gegenmaßnahmen, Bewertung
- Der Krieg der Code-Brecher (2002)
- Captured Kriegsmarine Enigma Documents at Bletchley Park (2008)
