= Margaret Rock =

British cryptoanalyst (1903–1983)

Margaret Alice Rock
- Born: 7 July 1903; Hammersmith, London, England
- Died: 26 August 1983 (aged 80); Worcester, Worcestershire, England
- Education: Portsmouth High School
- Alma mater: Bedford College, University of London
- Occupation: Cryptanalysis
- Known for: Codebreaking at Bletchley Park

Margaret Alice Rock (7 July 1903 – 26 August 1983) was one of the women mathematicians who worked in Bletchley Park during World War II. With her maths skills and education, Rock was able to decrypt messages encrypted by the Enigma machine used by the German Army. Her work during the war was classified by the Official Secrets Act 1939, so much of her work was not revealed during her lifetime.

== Early life ==
Rock was born and raised in Hammersmith, London by her parents Frank Ernest Rock and Alice Margaret Simmonds. Rock attended Edmonton elementary and North Middlesex School. Rock's father served in the Royal Navy as a surgeon between 1894 and 1896 while her mother took care of her and her brother. Frank Rock would send letters to his children frequently, to stay in communication in 1914, just before World War I.

In 1917, Margaret, her mother and brother settled in Portsmouth, after moving frequently for three years. Rock attended Portsmouth High School, an all female private boarding school. Her father died when the armed merchant cruiser HMS Laurentic sank off the coast of Ireland having struck two mines laid by a German U-boat. Rock was encouraged by the letters her late father wrote to her, telling her to keep up with her studies and to be successful in the future. Her brother, John Frank Rock, became a Lieutenant in the Royal Engineers.

== Education ==
Rock passed the London General School Exam in June 1919. During high school, she received honours in the classes of French, mathematics, and music. Rock went to Bedford College, University of London, to earn a Bachelors of Arts Degree in 1921.

After university, Rock was employed as a statistician by the National Association of Manufacturers (The Federation of British Industry). Rock predicted the economic market and how different businesses and companies would respond to the market. In her free time, Margaret and her brother would travel to different countries such as Italy, France, Switzerland, and Sri Lanka.

== World War II ==
Early in World War II, Rock and her mother evacuated from London to Cranleigh, Surrey. Margaret quit her old job, wanting a career in a time when the woman's role was primarily to be the wife and stay-at-home mother. She was then recruited for a new job at Bletchley Park on 15 April 1940. She worked for Admiral Sir Hugh Sinclair, who was the head of the Government Code and Cypher School and Secret Intelligence Service. She trained and worked alongside mathematicians and professors to decode enemy messages encrypted with the Enigma machine. Margaret went to work for Alfred Dilwyn Knox, where she worked closely with Mavis Lever on the same projects. While working for Dilwyn Knox she became the most senior cryptographer. Knox employed women, because he believed they had great skill with cryptography work. In August 1940 Margaret Rock was considered by Dilwyn Knox to be the 4th or 5th best in the whole Enigma staff. She specialized in German and Russian code breaking.

The German military considered the Enigma cipher unbreakable. By her hard work, Rock was ranked one of the better workers on the Enigma machine project, and was promoted to seniority and a higher salary. On 8 December 1941, an Abwehr Enigma message was decoded and read by the team in Bletchley Park by the use of a manual technique called "rodding" that was identified by Knox. This feat gave an advantage to Britain to plan the D-Day attack.

== After the war ==
Rock worked governmental jobs, such as at the Government Communications Headquarters, until she retired in 1963. Because of the Official Secrets Act 1939, Rock never spoke about her work to anyone. Even late in her life, when stories about Bletchley Park and codebreaking were making the news, she would not comment about her contribution to the Colossus. On 26 August 1983 she died in Ronkswood Hospital, Worcester.
