= Keith Batey =

English codebreaker (1919–2010)

Keith Batey (4 July 1919 – 28 August 2010) was a codebreaker who, with his wife, Mavis Batey (5 May 1921 – 12 November 2013), worked on the German Enigma machine at Bletchley Park during World War II.

== Education ==
Keith Batey was at Carlisle Grammar School and went on to study mathematics at Trinity College, Cambridge, under a state scholarship, where he met Gordon Welchman, who would later assemble a group of code-breakers for Bletchley Park at the outbreak of the war.

== Bletchley Park years ==
Batey was recruited by Welchman in 1940 and worked in Hut Six, which was responsible for breaking the German Army and Air Force Enigma ciphers. While there he met fellow code-breaker, Mavis Lever, who worked with Dilly Knox's research section, reconstructing new Enigma machines as they were introduced. Batey assisted Lever in reconstructing one of the rotors of a new Italian Enigma machine. They married in 1942.

In 1942, Batey wished for a more physically active role in the war as a pilot in the RAF, but was rejected due to his knowledge of Ultra and the risk of getting captured. Instead, he persuaded the authorities to allow him to train as a pilot with the Fleet Air Arm for the defence of Canadian waters. However, he was recalled to work in a newly created section known as ISK, standing for Intelligence Services (Knox) alongside his wife. Dilly Knox had just reconstructed the main Enigma cipher machine used by the Abwehr, German military intelligence, and the ISK section was to play a key role in the Double Cross System which "turned" German agents sent to Britain and elsewhere in the world and used them to feed false intelligence back to the Germans. During 1943, Batey broke the Enigma ciphers of the Sicherheitsdienst, the Nazi party's intelligence service, along with the cipher used by Italian military attachés in Berlin.

== Post war work ==
After the war, Batey worked with the Commonwealth Relations Office and joined the High Commission in Ottawa, Ontario, Canada. He worked there until 1951 when he transferred to become the private secretary to Philip Noel-Baker, Secretary of State for Commonwealth Relations.

Batey subsequently worked as the Secretary of the Chest, the official title for the chief financial officer of the University of Oxford, before becoming Treasurer of Christ Church in which role he played a key part in refurbishment of the Oxford college's historic buildings.

== History of Bletchley Park ==
Batey remained largely silent on his war work while his wife Mavis became much better known, cooperating with a number of books and television series, including Station X, the book of which went on to become a UK number-one bestseller. They advised actors Kate Winslet and Dougray Scott on what it was like to be a codebreaker at Bletchley for the Hollywood film Enigma (2001).

The Bateys demonstrated how the Abwehr Enigma machine worked during a visit by Prince Charles and the Duchess of Cornwall to Bletchley Park in 2008.
