= Whaddon Hall =

Country house in Buckinghamshire, England

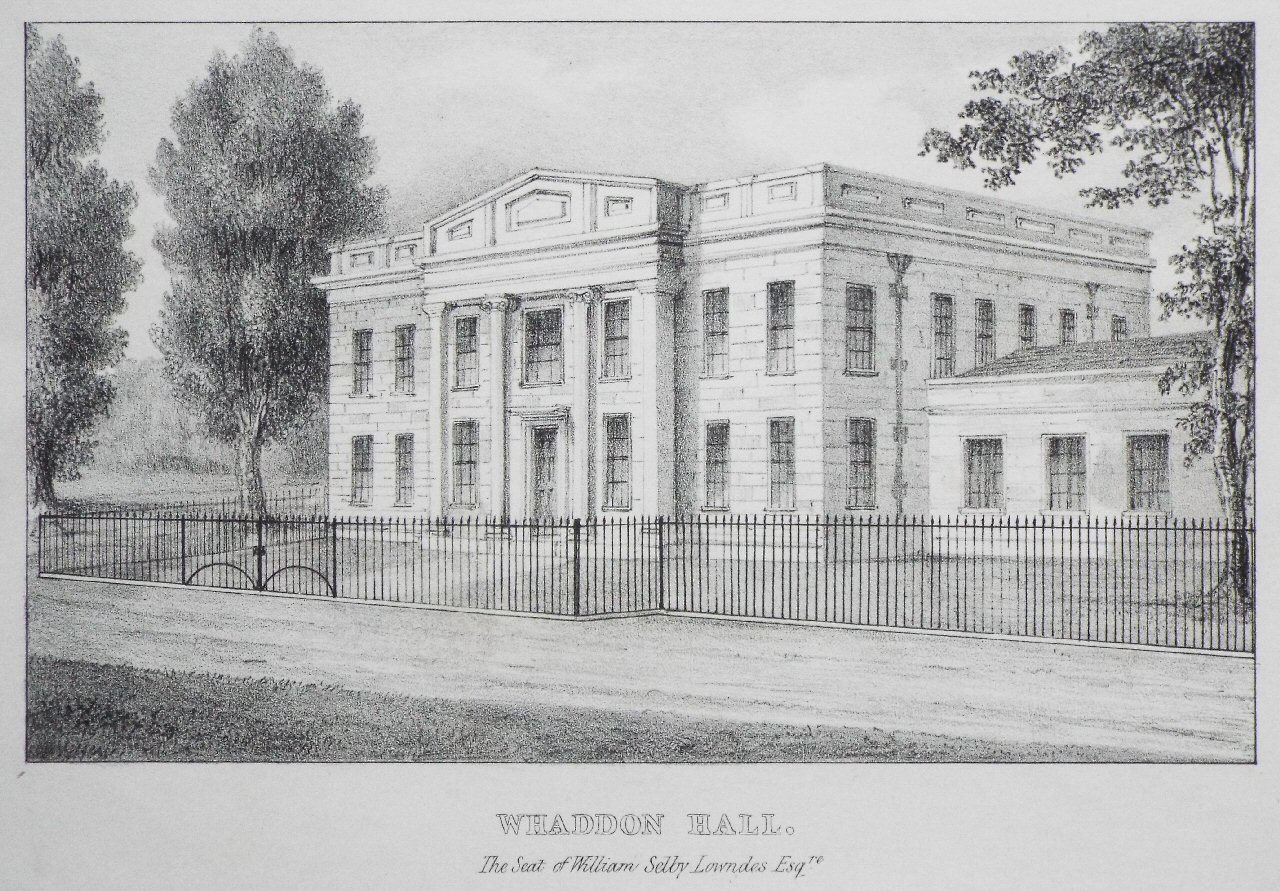
- Whaddon Hall
- Interactive map of Whaddon Hall

General information
- Location: Whaddon, Buckinghamshire, England
- Coordinates: 52.004°N 0.825°W
- Year built: 1820
- Renovated: c. 1980

Technical details
- Floor count: 2 + attic
- Designations

Listed Building – Grade II
- Official name: Whaddon Hall
- Designated: 24 September 1973
- Reference no.: 1287475

Whaddon Hall is a country house in Whaddon, Buckinghamshire, England. It is a Grade II listed building.

== History ==
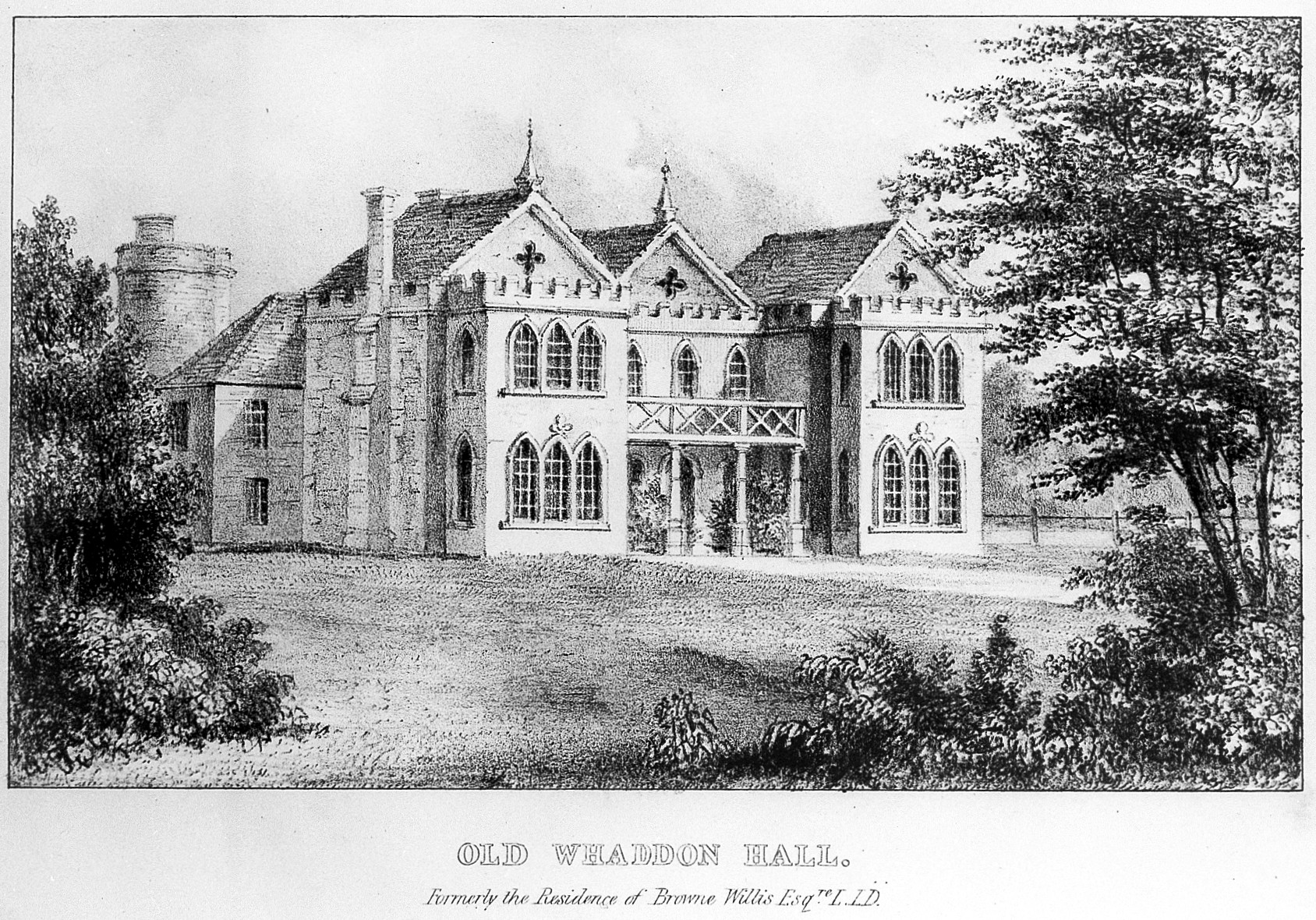
Old Whaddon Hall

The first manor house was built on the site in the 11th century. The present house was built in 1820, replacing a house which was demolished in the late 18th century. It was once home to the Selby family (also known as Selby-Lowndes), whose ancestor William Lowndes built the larger and grander Winslow Hall.

During the Second World War, Whaddon Hall served as headquarters of Section VIII (Communications) of the Secret Intelligence Service (SIS, or MI6), under the command of Brigadier Richard Gambier-Parry. The "Station X" wireless interception function was transferred here from Bletchley Park in February 1940. That facility, known as Main Line, served in a number of capacities, the most critical the sending of Ultra intelligence from Bletchley Park to officers in the field. The term Ultra was used to convey the status of the intelligence which was considered to be above Top Secret. It consisted of information that was gathered by breaking encrypted radio communications.

At the time that France fell to the Axis powers in June 1940, only a small number of SIS agents were in communication with Whaddon Hall. Early in the war, until about 1941, inexperienced SIS agents on the European continent spent too much time on the air, and jeopardised their security. However, by 1943, Gambier-Parry and his staff had engineered a substantial improvement in clandestine wireless communication. The covert wireless network that Gambier-Parry established allowed him to stay in communication with SIS agents in many countries.

The hall was converted for industrial use in the early 1960s and into a country club in the 1970s. Following a serious fire in 1976, it was refurbished and in the 1980s converted into flats; as of 2017 it is divided into four units.
