= Mavis Batey =

English codebreaker (1921–2013)

Mavis Batey MBE
- Born: Mavis Lilian Lever; 5 May 1921; Dulwich, London, England
- Died: 12 November 2013 (aged 92)
- Education: University College, London
- Occupation: Garden historian
- Known for: Codebreaking at Bletchley Park; garden conservation
- Spouse: Keith Batey (m. 1942–2010) (deceased)
- Children: 3
- Awards: Veitch Memorial Medal; 1985; MBE; 1987

Mavis Lilian Batey (née Lever; 5 May 1921 – 12 November 2013) was an English codebreaker during World War II and one of the leading female codebreakers at Bletchley Park.

Batey later became a historian of gardening, who campaigned to save historic parks and gardens, and an author. She was awarded the Veitch Memorial Medal in 1985 and made a Member of the Order of the British Empire (MBE) in 1987, in both cases for her work on the conservation of gardens.

== Early life ==
Mavis Lilian Lever was born on 5 May 1921 in Dulwich to her seamstress mother and postal worker father. She was brought up in Norbury and went to Coloma Convent Girls' School in Croydon. She was studying German at University College, London at the outbreak of World War II:

I was concentrating on German romantics and then I realised the German romantics would soon be overhead and I thought well, I really ought to do something better for the war effort.

She decided to interrupt her university studies. At first she applied to be a nurse but discovered that her linguistic skills were in high demand for war work.

== Codebreaking ==
Mavis Lever (as she was then) was recruited to work for the Secret Intelligence Service (MI6). At first, she was employed by the London section to check the personal columns of The Times for coded spy messages. In May 1940, aged 19 and untrained in cryptography, she was recruited to work as a codebreaker at Bletchley Park. She worked as an assistant to Dilly Knox, a classical scholar and papyrologist from King's College, Cambridge, an eccentric who, in 1920, forgot to invite two of his brothers to his wedding. Knox had an innocent preference for recruiting women and his group was sometimes referred to as "Knox and his girls" or even "Dilly and his fillies".

Knox's opening remarks to her were "Hello, we're breaking machines. Have you got a pencil? Here, have a go". When she looked at the papers she was handed and replied that it was "all Greek" to her, Knox laughed and said "I wish it were". The small group that she had joined concentrated on the Italian Navy's messages that were enciphered using Italian Navy Cipher D, a variation of the commercial Enigma that had no plugboard and was thus easier to solve. The methods included 'rodding' and known-plaintext attack (which was called 'cribbing' at Bletchley Park). Knox wanted to establish whether the Italian Navy were using the same Enigma system as during the Spanish Civil War. He instructed his assistants to use rodding to see whether the crib PERX (per being Italian for "for" and X being used to indicate a space between words) worked for the first part of the message. After three months there was no success, but Mavis Lever found that rodding produced PERS for the first four letters of one message. She then (against orders) tried beyond this and obtained PERSONALE (Italian for "personal"). This confirmed that the Italians were indeed using the same machines and procedures as before. When it became clear that Mavis Lever had a talent for this work, she was promoted. This was a relief to her, as previously the cost of her billet consumed 70% of her salary.

Knox's group suffered a setback when the Italians introduced a new rotor with different wiring. A serious cryptographic weakness of Enigma was that it always changed the letter entered on the keyboard to a different one, i.e. a letter was never enciphered as itself. When there was not much traffic, the Italians would send dummy messages, perhaps to thwart signal analysis efforts. One such message was received following the introduction of the new wheel, and Mavis Lever observed that it contained all the letters of the alphabet except L. She guessed that a lazy operator had been told to send a dummy message, but had merely repeatedly pressed the bottom right letter on the Enigma keyboard, L. Realising the potential importance of this, she went to Hut 6 where German air force and army enigma messages were being decrypted, to seek the help of what Knox referred to as "one of the clever Cambridge mathematicians". That person was Keith Batey and together they solved the problem. Mavis and Keith married in November 1942.

The Allied success in the naval Battle of Cape Matapan in March 1941 was an early example of the contribution of the work at Bletchley Park to the war effort. The more messages read, the more cribs became available. One of these cribs was SUPERMARINA, meaning Naval High Command, which was used in a message from Rome to Crete that included "Today 25 March 1941 is the day minus three". Mavis Lever and her colleagues, including Margaret Rock, worked for three days and nights and discovered that the Italians were intending to attack a Royal Navy convoy transporting supplies from Cairo to Greece. The messages they deciphered provided a detailed plan of the Italian assault. Unusually, this information was forwarded directly to the Commander-in-Chief of the Mediterranean Fleet, Admiral Sir Andrew Cunningham in Alexandria, which led to the Italian fleet being ambushed by Cunningham, losing three cruisers and two destroyers. The naval historian Vincent O'Hara described the Battle of Matapan as "Italy's greatest defeat at sea, subtracting from its order of battle a cruiser division, but the battle was hardly decisive." When next in England, Admiral Cunningham visited Bletchley Park to thank Knox, Batey, and her fellow code-breakers for making his victory possible. Knox wrote a poem to celebrate the Allied success at Matapan. He included a stanza dedicated to Batey and the key role she had played in the victory:

"When Cunningham won at Matapan, By the grace of God and Mavis,

"Nigro simillima cygno est, praise Heaven, A very rara avis"

("Like the black swan, she is, praise heaven, a very rare bird".)

It was, she later said, "very heady stuff for a 19-year-old".

The Abwehr, the German military intelligence service, used different Enigma machines from the Army, Navy and Air Force, without a plugboard but with additional turnover notches. Knox, Rock and Mavis Lever worked on this. In December 1941 she broke a message between Belgrade and Berlin that enabled the team to work out the wiring of the machine. Later, they broke another Abwehr machine, the GGG. This enabled the British to read the Abwehr messages and confirm that the Germans believed the Double-Cross intelligence they were being fed by the double agents who were recruited by Britain as spies.

Batey wrote a biography of Dilly Knox, Dilly: The Man Who Broke Enigmas. The book gives a summary of the government codes and cypher school's codebreaking operation at Bletchley Park and describes her codebreaking of the Italian Enigma.

== Later life and awards ==
Batey spent some time after 1945 in the Diplomatic Service. She then brought up three children, two daughters and a son. She published a number of books on garden history, as well as some relating to Bletchley Park, and served as president of the Garden History Society, of which she became secretary in 1971.

She was awarded the Veitch Memorial Medal in 1985 and made a Member of the Order of the British Empire (MBE) in 1987, in both cases for her work on the conservation of gardens.

Batey, a widow since 2010, died on 12 November 2013 at age 92.

In 2005, The Gardens Trust held the first Annual Mavis Batey Essay Prize, a competition geared towards international students who are enrolled in a university, institution of higher education or who have recently graduated from one. The award celebrates Batey's achievements and advocacy in gardening.

== Works ==
- —— (1982). Oxford Gardens: The University's Influence on Garden History. Avebury. ISBN 978-0861270026.
- —— (1983). Nuneham Courtenay: An Oxfordshire 18th-century Deserted Village.
- —— (1984). Reader's Digest Guide to Creative Gardening.
- —— (1988). Jacques, David; van der Horst, Arend Jan (eds.). The Gardens of William and Mary. London: Christopher Helm. ISBN 978-0747016083.
- —— (1989). The Historic Gardens of Oxford & Cambridge. Macmillan. ISBN 978-0333446805.
- ——; with David Lambert (1990). The English Garden Tour: A View Into the Past. John Murray. ISBN 978-0719547751.
- —— (Spring 1991). "Horace Walpole as Modern Garden Historian". Garden History. 19 (1): 1–11. doi:10.2307/1586988. JSTOR 1586988.
- —— (1995). Regency Gardens. Shire Books. ISBN 978-0747802891.
- —— (1995). Story of the Privy Garden at Hampton Court. Barn Elms. ISBN 978-1899531011.
- —— (1996). Jane Austen and the English Landscape. Barn Elms. ISBN 9781556523069.
- —— (1998). The World of Alice.
- —— (1999). Alexander Pope: Poetry and Landscape. Barn Elms. ISBN 978-1-89953-105-9.
- —— (2008). From Bletchley with Love. Bletchley Park Trust. ISBN 978-1-906723-04-0.
- —— (2009). Dilly: The Man Who Broke Enigmas. Dialogue. ISBN 978-1-90644-701-4.
- —— (2017). "Breaking machines with a pencil (chapter 11)". In Copeland, Jack; et al. (eds.). The Turing Guide. Oxford University Press. pp. 97–107. ISBN 978-0-19-874783-3.
