= Hugh Sebag-Montefiore =

British writer (born 1955)

Nicholas Hugh Sebag-Montefiore (born 5 March 1955) is a British writer. He trained as a barrister before becoming a journalist and then a non-fiction writer.

== Biography ==
He has published two books on the history of the Second World War, of which the first was Enigma: The Battle for the Code in 2000 and concerned the breaking of the German Enigma machine code at Bletchley Park. In 2006, Dunkirk: Fight to the Last Man came out.

He was among the signatories of the 2007 open letter to the BBC against the closure of the Timewatch documentary series, published in The Guardian.

In 2016, Somme: Into the Breach appeared in time for the 100th anniversary of the Somme Offensive during the First World War.

== Family background ==
He has been married since 1989 to Aviva Burnstock, the head of the Department of Art Conservation & Technology at the Courtauld Institute in London. His brother Simon Sebag Montefiore is also a writer, besides being an historian. His cousin Denzil was a platoon commander at Dunkirk.

Through his paternal grandmother Audrey Haldinstein, he is a great-great-grandson of Herbert Leon, who owned Bletchley Park until he died in 1926.

Cecil Sebag-Montefiore, the author's great-grandfather, committed suicide after serving with the Royal Engineers on the western Front of World War I.

Montefiore's father, Stephen Eric Sebag-Montefiore, was descended from a line of wealthy Sephardic Jews who were diplomats and bankers all over Europe. At the start of the 19th century, his great-great uncle, Sir Moses Montefiore, became a banking partner of N M Rothschild & Sons. His mother, Phyllis April Jaffé, comes from a Lithuanian Jewish family of poor scholars. Her parents fled the Russian Empire at the turn of the 20th century; they bought tickets for New York City, but were cheated, being instead dropped off at Cork, Ireland. During the Limerick Boycott of 1904 they left Ireland and moved to Newcastle, England. The father of his namesake, Bishop of Birmingham Hugh Montefiore, was the great-great-nephew of Sir Moses.

== Books ==
- Kings on the Catwalk: The Louis Vuitton and Moët-Hennessy Affair, London: Chapmans, 1992 (ISBN 9781855925250)
- Enigma: The Battle for the Code, London: Weidenfeld & Nicolson, 2000 (ISBN 029784251X); revised edition: Phoenix, 2001 (ISBN 9780753811306)
- Dunkirk: Fight to the Last Man, London: Viking, 2006 (ISBN 9780670910823); revised edition: Penguin Books, 2015 (ISBN 9780241972267) (Note: A reviewer judged the book's title to be "misleading" in suggesting that "the BEF fought to its last man in France in 1940", although he noted that several such cases are discussed in the book and that the Oxfordshire and Buckinghamshire regiment received such orders but did not fulfil them.)
- Somme: Into the Breach, London: Viking, 2016 (ISBN 9780670918386); revised edition: Penguin Books, 2017 (ISBN 9780141043326)
