= Harold Keen =

British engineer

Harold Hall "Doc" Keen OBE (1894–1973) was a British engineer who produced the engineering design, and oversaw the construction of, the British bombe, a codebreaking machine used in World War II to read German messages sent using the Enigma machine. He was known as "Doc" Keen because of his habit of carrying tools and paperwork in a case resembling a doctor's bag. After the war he was awarded the O.B.E.

== Career before World War II ==
Keen was born in the borough of Shoreditch in east London in 1894. By age 18 he had moved to Kentish Town and began studying Electrical Engineering. In 1912 he joined the British Tabulating Machine Company (BTM), established to import and assemble American punched card technology. In 1916, Keen joined the Royal Flying Corps and was assigned to the ground staff of a bomber squadron in northern France. In 1919 he returned to BTM and married an Eva Burningham. In 1921, Keen moved with BTM to Letchworth in Hertfordshire. Two years later, he was appointed head of the Experimental Department, and his innovations there gained him the reputation as the leading British innovator of punched-card technology; Keen was granted more than sixty patents. In the 1930s he became Chief Engineer.

== World War II – British bombes ==
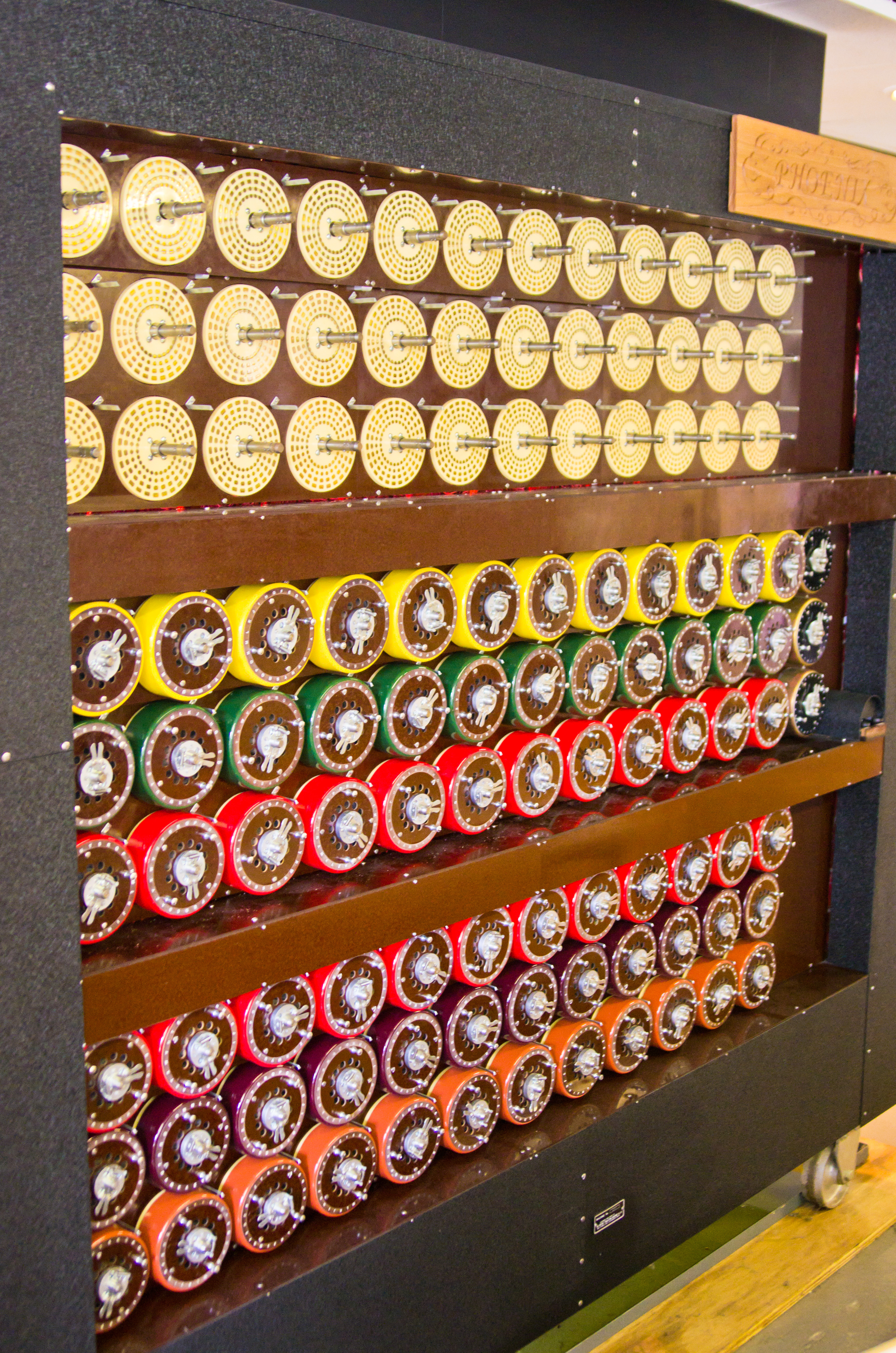
The working rebuilt bombe at Bletchley Park museum. Each of the rotating drums simulates the action of an Enigma rotor. There are 36 Enigma-equivalents and, on the right hand end of the middle row, three indicator drums. John Harper led the 'Phoenix' team that built this. It was officially switched on by the Duke of Kent, patron of the British Computer Society on 17 July 2008.

A machine called the cryptologic bomb (Polish: bomba kryptologiczna) had been produced by the Polish codebreakers in their successful breaking of Enigma before 1939. It was, however, useful only as long as the Germans continued with particular weaknesses in operating procedure, which they gradually tightened up, so that the Polish success rate diminished dramatically. Alan Turing designed the British bombe on a more general principle, the assumption of the presence of text, called a crib, that cryptanalysts could predict was likely to be present at a defined point in the message. This technique is termed a known plaintext attack and had been used to a limited extent by the Poles, e.g., the Germans' use of "ANX" — German for "To," followed by "X" as a spacer.

As chief engineer at the British Tabulating Machine Company at Letchworth Keen was approached to turn these ideas into a working reality. The first bombe, which was based on Turing's original design, was installed in Hut 1 at Bletchley Park on 18 March 1940 and was named "Victory". The second bombe, named "Agnus dei", later shortened to "Agnes", or "Aggie", was equipped with an important additional feature, the diagonal board that had been designed by Gordon Welchman. It was installed on 8 August 1940; "Victory" was later returned to Letchworth to have a diagonal board fitted.

During 1940, 178 messages were broken on the two machines, nearly all successfully. Because of the danger of bombes at Bletchley Park being lost if there were to be a bombing raid, five bombe outstations were established, at Adstock, Gayhurst, Wavendon, Stanmore, and Eastcote. The bombe was referred to by Group Captain Winterbotham as a "Bronze Goddess" because of its colour. The devices were more prosaically described by operators as being "like great big metal bookcases".

== See also ==
- Cryptanalysis of the Enigma — detailing the part played by Harold Keen
- Ultra (cryptography) — detailing the intelligence gained from cryptanalysis of the Enigma and cryptanalysis of the Lorenz cipher
- Joseph Desch — the research director of the project to design and manufacture the US Navy version of the Bombe
