= Dora Metcalf =

Anglo-Irish entrepreneur, engineer and mathematician

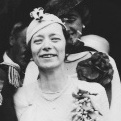
- Metcalf in 1935
- Born: Dora Greene; March 11, 1892; Madras (now Chennai), India
- Died: October 17, 1982 (aged 90); Otley, England
- Occupations: Entrepreneur, mathematician, computing pioneer

Dora Stuart Primrose Metcalf (11 March 1892 – 17 October 1982) was an India-born Irish entrepreneur, mathematician and computing pioneer. During World War I she was a comptometer operator in a munitions factory during which time she realised the potential in the mechanical descendants of the abacus. During World War II she was involved with supplying the "bombe" decryption machines to the codebreakers at Bletchley Park in England.

== Early life ==
Dora Metcalf (née Greene) was born to Irish parents in Madras (now Chennai) in India. She was the oldest of three children born to Eleanor Emily Ernestine née Burton (born 1868) and George Percy Greene (1862–1900, born in Lisburn, County Antrim in Ireland), the Superintendent of the Madras Survey. The couple had married at All Souls' Church in Coimbatore, Tamil Nadu in India in 1890. Metcalf's father died when she was eight years-old resulting in her and her family having to return to England.

She attended Bedford High School in Bedfordshire before winning a scholarship to take an external degree with the University of London aged 15, gaining her Bachelor’s degree in mathematics in 1911 aged 19. She initially became a teacher as Junior Mathematics and Riding Mistress at Allenswood Academy in south London.

During World War I she worked as a comptometer operator in a munitions factory during which time she came to realise the potential of the mechanical calculator as a descendant of the abacus. The comptometer was the first commercially successful key-driven mechanical calculator. After her fiancé Lt. Hugh Launcelot Cass (1891–1915) was killed by a sniper at Cape Helles in Turkey during the Gallipoli campaign during World War I she thought of herself as one of the 'surplus women' and gave up hope of ever marrying due to the loss of so many men's lives and concentrated on a career in computing, from 1916 selling comptometers in Belfast in Ireland. She regularly kept in touch with Cass’s family until she met her future husband in 1932.

== Computing career ==
In 1916, age 24, Greene was sent to Belfast to introduce comptometers into the shipyard offices. She stayed with George Clark, who owned the Workman, Clark & Company shipyard. Her time in Ireland began whilst the country was beginning the process of independence.

The comptometry business was successful and in 1917 Greene also set up offices in Dublin and Cork. In Dublin she stayed with Matilda Knowles, a leading botanist whose home was a gathering place for Dublin’s intelligentsia, with visitors including Dr Katherine Maguire and Dr Kathleen Lynn, who would be the founder of St Ultan’s Hospital for women and children, as well as Robert Barton, Erskine Childers and W. B. Yeats.

Greene realised that businessmen and government department managers did not have the understanding or the mathematical knowledge to make full use of the comptometers. As a trained mathematician and an evolving entrepreneur she realised the potential for providing services rather than merely hardware. To this end, in 1924 she founded Calculating And Statistical Services (CSS), with her cousin Everard Greene, co-founder of the British Tabulating Machine Company, and a friend Sam Haughton (Col SG Haughton MP, 1889-1959). She had met Haughton, a well connected Orangeman and Freemason and a leader of the Irish linen industry at Matilda Knowles’ home.

CSS was awarded the contract to analyse the data from the Northern Irish census of 1926. She opened a Dublin office in 1929. She created an international market for information services using comptometers and tabulators; her largest client was the Irish Hospitals' Sweepstake. Other clients in Ireland included the Electricity Supply Board, Great Southern Railways and shipbuilders Harland & Wolff. She opened a London office in 1932.

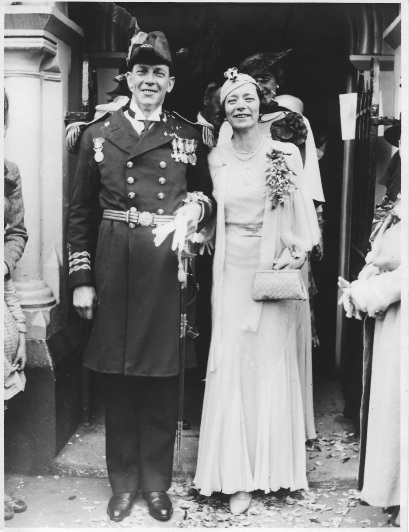
John and Dora Metcalf on their wedding day

In 1934 she joined British Tabulating Machine Company (BTM), and founded the Service Bureaux Division, at the same time continuing to run her own successful company, Calculating And Statistical Services. She married Royal Navy officer Commander John Savile Dent Metcalf DSC, RD, MiD (1895–1975) in August 1935 and was then known as Dora Metcalf.

During World War II BTM supplied the "bombe" decryption machines to the codebreakers at Bletchley Park in England. Metcalf was in charge of managing the supply contract but ill health forced her to leave this work in 1942.

After the War in 1949 Metcalf worked with physician Dorothy Price on the BCG tuberculosis vaccination programme in Ireland through St Ultan's Hospital. She was responsible for introducing the first electronic computer into Ireland in 1957 selling it to Michael Joe Costello of Irish Sugar. She retired in 1962.

== Later years ==
John and Dora Metcalf enjoyed fishing for salmon and trout and in order to pursue this hobby on their retirement they relocated from London to Loch Morar, where they stayed until 1970 following which they spent their final years in Otley in Yorkshire.

Dora Metcalf died in 1982 aged 90 and was buried in the Lawnswood Cemetery and Crematorium in Leeds in West Yorkshire.
