= Desch =

Desch is a surname. Notable people with the surname include:

- August Desch (1898–1964), American hurdler
- Joseph Desch (1907–1987), American engineer and cryptologist
- Madison Desch (born 1997), American artistic gymnast

== See also ==
- Desch, a character in Final Fantasy III
