= United States Naval Computing Machine Laboratory =

Former cryptography laboratory

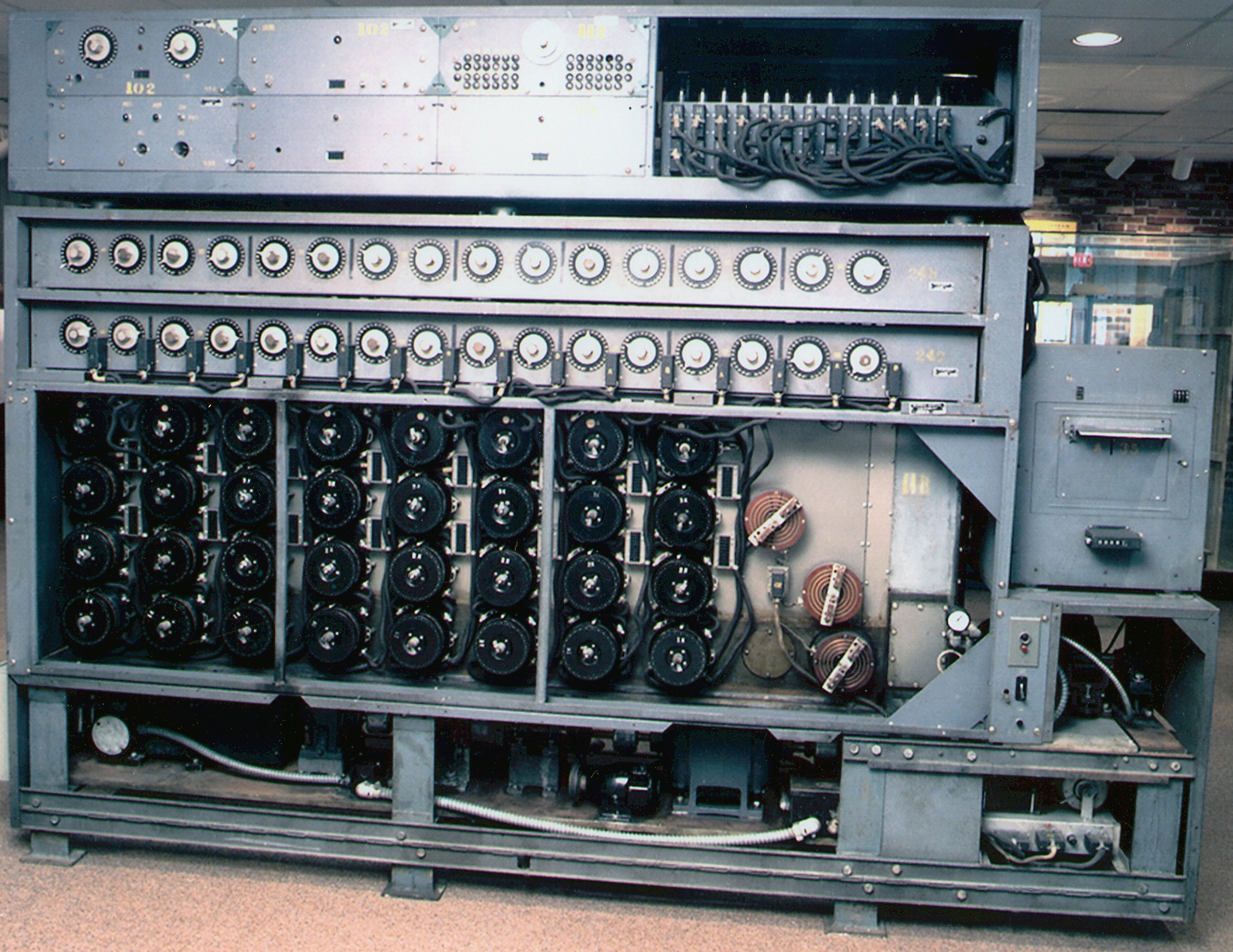
US Navy bombe at the National Cryptologic Museum.

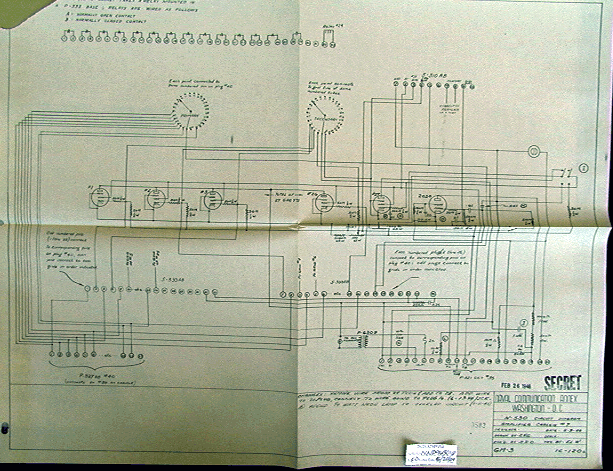
Partial schematics of the US Navy bombe.

The United States Naval Computing Machine Laboratory (NCML) was a highly secret design and manufacturing site for code-breaking machinery located in Building 26 of the National Cash Register (NCR) company in Dayton, Ohio and operated by the United States Navy during World War II. It is now on the List of IEEE Milestones, and one of its machines is on display at the National Cryptologic Museum.

== History ==
The laboratory was established in 1942 by the Navy and National Cash Register Company to design and manufacture a series of code-breaking machines ("bombes") targeting German Enigma machines, based on earlier work by the British at Bletchley Park (which in turn owed something to pre-war Polish cryptanalytical work). Joseph Desch led the effort. Preliminary designs, approved in September 1942, called for a fully electronic machine to be delivered by year's end. However, these plans were soon judged infeasible, and revised plans were approved in January 1943 for an electromechanical machine, which became the US Navy bombe.

These designs were proceeding in parallel with, and influenced by, British attempts to build a high-speed bombe for the German 4-rotor Enigma. Indeed, Alan Turing visited Dayton in December 1942. His reaction was far from enthusiastic:

It seems a pity for them to go out of their way to build a machine to do all this stopping if it is not necessary. I am now converted to the extent of thinking that starting from scratch on the design of a Bombe, this method is about as good as our own. The American Bombe program was to produce 336 Bombes, one for each wheel order. I used to smile inwardly at the conception of Bombe hut routine implied by this program. Their test (of commutators) can hardly be considered conclusive as they were not testing for the bounce with electronic stop finding devices. Nobody seems to be told about rods or offiziers or banburismus unless they are really going to do something about it.

The American approach was, however, successful. The first two experimental bombes went into operation in May 1943, running in Dayton so they could be observed by their engineers. Designs for production models were completed in April, 1943, with initial operation starting in early June.

All told, the laboratory constructed 121 bombes which were then employed for code-breaking in the US Navy's signals intelligence and cryptanalysis group OP-20-G in Washington, D.C. Construction was accomplished in three shifts per day by some 600 WAVES (Women Accepted for Volunteer Emergency Service), 100 Navy officers and enlisted men, and a large civilian workforce. Approximately 3,000 workers operated the bombes to produce "Ultra" decryptions of German Enigma traffic.

According to a contemporary US Navy report (dated April 1944), the bombes were used on naval jobs until all daily keys had been run; then the machines were used for non-naval tasks. During the previous six months, about 45% of the bombe time had been devoted to non-naval problems carried out at the request of the British. British production and reliability problems with their own high-speed bombes had then recently led to construction of 50 additional Navy units for Army and Air Force keys.

The documentary, ″Dayton Codebreakers″, producer Aileen LeBlanc, was released in 2006 on American Public Television.

== Building ==
The location in Dayton, Building 26 on the former National Cash Register Company, was an Art Deco design of Dayton firm Schenck & Williams and was located at Patterson Blvd and Stewart Street. The building was demolished by the University of Dayton in January 2008.

== See also ==
- Cryptanalysis of the Enigma
- Bomba (cryptography)
- Bombe
- Bletchley Park
- Ultra (cryptography)

== Bibliography ==
- History of the Bombe Project (US Navy memo, April 1944)
- John A. N. Lee, Colin Burke, and Deborah Anderson, "The US Bombes, NCR, Joseph Desch, and 600 WAVES: The First Reunion of the US Naval Computing Machine Laboratory", IEEE Annals of the History of Computing, Volume 22, No. 3 July – September 2000.
- Dayton Codebreakers
- IEEE Global History Network IEEE History Center
- Oral history interview with Robert E. Mumma, Charles Babbage Institute, University of Minnesota. Mumma recounts how NCR's war-time work on cryptanalytic equipment took all the company's effort, and how this shaped company policy resisting government contract work after the war.
- Oral history interview with Carl Rench, Charles Babbage Institute, University of Minnesota.
- DeBrosse, Jim; Burke, Colin (2004), The Secret in Building 26: The Untold Story of America's Ultra War Against the U-Boat Enigma Codes, Random House, ISBN 978-0375508073
