= Dorothy Price (physician) =

Irish doctor

Dorothy Stopford Price
- Dorothy Price at Meath Hospital
- Born: Dorothy Stopford; 9 September 1890; Dublin, Ireland
- Died: 30 January 1954 (aged 63); Dublin, Ireland
- Occupation: Physician
- Known for: BCG Vaccine

Dorothy Stopford Price (9 September 1890 – 30 January 1954) was an Irish physician who was key to the elimination of childhood tuberculosis in Ireland by introducing the BCG vaccine.

== Early life ==
Eleanor Dorothy Stopford was born on 9 September 1890 at Newstead, Clonskeagh, County Dublin, to Jemmett Stopford, a civil servant, and Constance Kennedy.

Jemmett Stopford was descended from a long line of Church of Ireland clerics. Constance Kennedy, also a Protestant, was the daughter of Dr Evory Kennedy, a master of the Rotunda Hospital, Dublin, from 1833 to 1840. Her aunt was the Irish nationalist historian Alice Stopford Green.

The Stopfords had four children: Alice, Edie, Dorothy and Robert. The births of the children are registered at different addresses in south Dublin. In 1887 they were living at Roebuck Lodge, Dundrum, in 1890 at Newstead, Clonskeagh, and in 1895 at 28 Highfield Road, Rathgar.

Jemmett Stopford died from typhoid fever in 1902, and the medical costs incurred in his illness left the family so badly off that Constance Kennedy had to sell the family home of Wyvern in Bushy Park Road in Terenure, Rathfarnham. The family relocated to 65 Campden Gardens, West Kensington, London.

She lived through two World Wars, the Spanish Influenza pandemic, the 1916 Rising in Ireland, and the foundation of a new Irish state. She was brought up as a child of the British Empire, living first in Dublin and later in London. She spent Easter 1916 as a guest of Sir Matthew Nathan, the British Under-Secretary. While residing there, she had a unique view of the Easter Rising as seen by the British administration in Ireland. Her Easter 1916 diary is in the Irish National Library, Dublin. After the Rising, she began to question her political allegiances and embraced Irish nationalism.

== Education ==
Dorothy first began her education by working with the Charitable Organisation Society, where she studied a form of social science. She also passed an examination to study Art, Design and Ornamentation in the Regent Street Polytechnic. She sat a further exam which gave her the opportunity to enter the Royal College of Art, but did not do so.

She ultimately decided to study medicine at age 25, and was a medical student in Trinity College Dublin from 1916 to 1921. She graduated with a BA in 1920, BAO (Bachelor in Obstetrics), BCh (Bachelor in Surgery) and MB in 1921. As part of her training she worked in the Meath Hospital, Dublin, as a clinical clerk. In 1918-19, she witnessed the Spanish flu at first hand. She tended to victims during the day and cycled to the mortuary at night to carry out post mortems.

== Career ==
Owner's permit for motor vehicle, 1923

After she qualified as a doctor, Dorothy's first job was as a dispensary doctor in Kilbrittain in County Cork, where she also engaged in the Irish War of Independence, tending to injured members of the Irish Republican Army. During the ensuing Irish Civil War, she favoured the Republican side. Dorothy joined Cumann na mBan, an auxiliary of the Irish Volunteers, and gave lectures on first aid as part of her involvement. Her biggest career achievements were through her involvements with tuberculosis. She was first exposed to the disease when John Richard Green, husband of her aunt, Alice Stopford Green, died from the condition. She also attended a Tuberculosis Day in Walworth at| the invitation of Mrs Anstruther, a social worker friend of her aunt.

In 1923, she returned to Dublin and began work in Saint Ultan's Children's Hospital, Dublin as a visiting physician. This was an honorary, unpaid position. Dorothy began to research and write about tuberculosis, particularly in the context of children. After a 1931 visit to Vienna, she began to use the tuberculin test to diagnose tuberculosis.

She was interested in the controversial BCG vaccine which could protect against tuberculosis. Her work with tuberculin had shown that many Irish adolescents from rural areas were tuberculin negative and vulnerable to contracting tuberculosis. She was anxious that Irish emigrants, including young Irish nurses and nurse trainees, be vaccinated.

In 1949, Price was appointed as the first chairperson of the Irish National BCG Committee. She learned German while working at St Ultan's to translate and read German literature on TB. She took a post-graduate course in Scheidess before preparing a thesis on The Diagnosis of Primary Tuberculosis in Children, which described modern continental theories and practices, and won her an MD. She began writing her book Tuberculosis in Childhood in 1937 and had 1000 copies of it produced by a Bristol-based publisher in 1939. She became a member for the Red Cross Anti-TB committee, but later resigned for political reasons. In 1949 she involved Dora Metcalfe, the Irish computing pioneer, with the vaccination programme. She was recognised for her work when Health Minister Noel Browne appointed her as Chairperson of a Consultative Council on TB. They eventually managed to open a BCG vaccination unit in St Ultan's Hospital.

Her research and publications, her work on voluntary national committees and her continuous highlighting of the problem of tuberculosis in Ireland as well as her efforts to introduce tuberculin testing and BCG vaccination were pivotal in the ending of the Irish tuberculosis epidemic in the mid-20th century.

== Personal life ==
Stopford married William George "Liam" Price, a barrister, district justice and local historian from Wicklow. They became engaged in 1924, surprising many as Stopford was a republican (anti-Treaty) while Price was a Free State supporter (pro-Treaty).

They wed on 8 January 1925 in St Ann's Church, Dawson Street. They first took up residence in Fitzwilliam Place. Dorothy Price discovered she was unable to have children in 1926. Liam Price later compiled an account of his wife's fight against TB by 1955.

== Death ==
She suffered a stroke in January 1950, which led to her relocating to 1 Herbert Park, Ballsbridge. She died on 30 January 1954, aged 63, after suffering another stroke. She was buried in St Maelruen's graveyard in Tallaght.

== Legacy ==
Medical professor Victor Millington Synge stated that "To her, more than anyone else, is due the credit of introducing into Ireland modern ideas of, and preventive measures against tuberculosis. Few of the many thousands of children and young people who have been saved from death or tedious illness by BCG realize what they owe to Dorothy Price." Her professional archives are in the Library of Trinity College Dublin.
