= Jean Valentine (bombe operator) =

Bombe operator (1924–2019)

Jean Millar Valentine
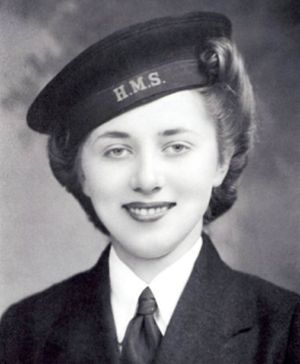
- Born: Jean Millar Valentine; 7 July 1924; Perth, Scotland
- Died: 17 May 2019 (aged 94); Henley-on-Thames, England
- Known for: Bombe operation as a Wren at Bletchley Park
- Spouse: Clive Ingram Rooke (m. 1946–1998) (deceased)
- Children: 2

Jean Millar Valentine, later Jean Millar Rooke (7 July 1924 – 17 May 2019) was an operator of the Bombe decryption device in Hut 11 at Bletchley Park in England, designed by Alan Turing and others during World War II. She was a member of the 'Wrens' (Women's Royal Naval Service, WRNS). She was later involved in the reconstruction of the Bombe at Bletchley Park Museum and gave tours there.

== Early life ==
Jean Millar Valentine was born in Perth, Scotland on 7 July 1924 to Mr and Mrs James Valentine. She became a member of the WRNS during World War II and was recruited to work in Bletchley Park at the age of 18. Valentine later said that moving down to London was a new experience for her, as she had never been out of Scotland up to that point.

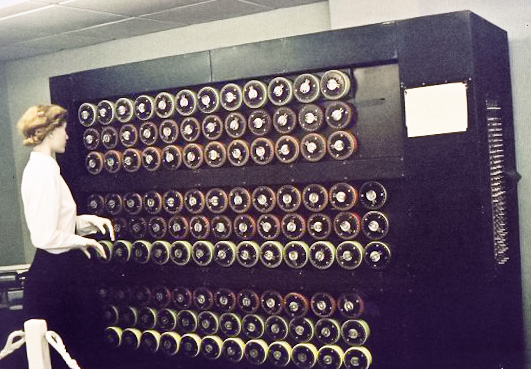
A mockup of a bombe at Bletchley Park, as operated by Valentine during World War II

== Career in code breaking ==
Valentine was one of many women recruited to work at Bletchley Park during the war. During this time, she lived in Steeple Claydon in Buckinghamshire. She started work on 15 shillings (75 pence) a week. Along with her co-workers, she signed the Official Secrets Act, and remained quiet about her war work until the mid-1970s. Churchill referred to them as "the geese who laid the golden egg and never cackled".

Valentine later described how no-one would ever talk about what they were doing when outside of Bletchley Park. She worked in Hut 11, and recalled there were "five machines within the hut, ten girls and one petty officer that would be in charge of the telephone". She was four foot and ten inches (1m47) in height and used a footstool to operate the top rotors.

She was trained to decrypt Japanese codes and was posted to Ceylon (now Sri Lanka) where she spent 15 months working on Japanese meteorological reports. While there, she met Clive Rooke, a Seafire pilot in the Royal Navy, whom she married in 1945.

Valentine kept silent about her work on the Bombe until the 1970s when details began to emerge in public. Thereafter, she was an enthusiastic participant in reunions at Bletchley Park. Valentine was involved with the reconstruction of the Bombe at Bletchley Park Museum, completed in 2006. In 2006, she said: "Unless people come pouring through the doors, a vital piece of history is lost. The more we can educate them, the better."

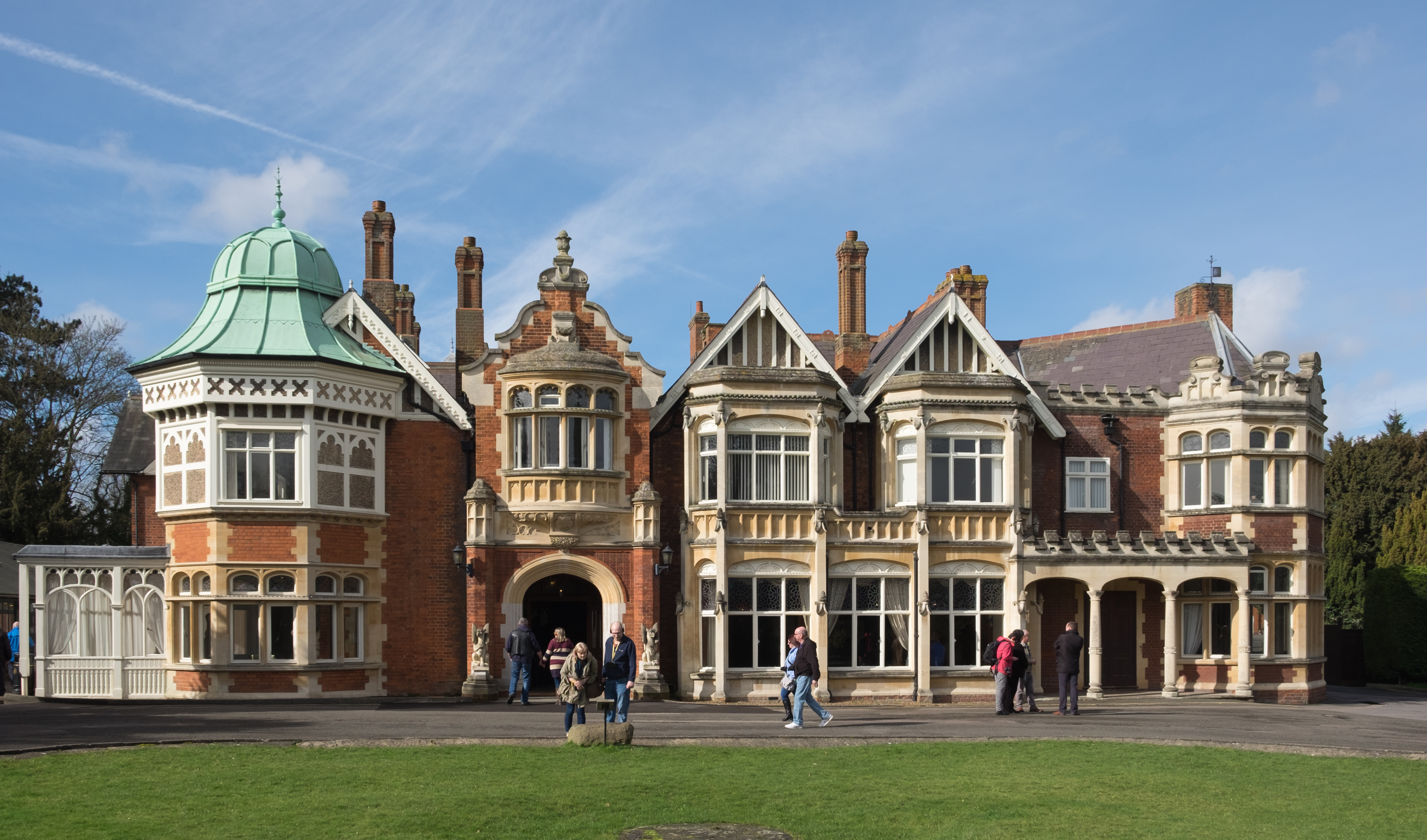
Bletchley Park mansion

Valentine volunteered as a tour guide at the Bletchley Park Museum, demonstrating the reconstructed Bombe. In 2010, she took part in Antiques Roadshow with Fiona Bruce. In 2011, she demonstrated the Bombe to the Queen and the Duke of Edinburgh.

In 2012, Valentine took part in Celebrity MasterChef at Bletchley Park. On 24 June 2012, Valentine spoke about her wartime experiences at Bletchley Park and elsewhere as part of a Turing's Worlds event to celebrate the centenary of the birth of Alan Turing, organised by the Department for Continuing Education's Rewley House at Oxford University in cooperation with the British Society for the History of Mathematics.

In 2018, Valentine opened the Bletchley Park Bombe Gallery with wartime Bombe operator and Bombe guide, Ruth Bourne.

Valentine took part in the Alan Turing episode of Absolute Genius with Dick and Dom on CBBC.

== Recognition and awards ==
Valentine is commemorated on the Bletchley Park Roll of Honour, which contains a digital copy of her service certificate and a short memoir. She featured on a St Vincent and Grenadines stamp commemorating the 60th Anniversary of D-Day in 2004. In 2009, she and other veterans were presented with a medal from GCHQ in recognition of their wartime service.

== Later life and death ==
Valentine latterly lived in Henley, Oxfordshire. She died in May 2019 at the age of 94.

== See also ==
- List of people associated with Bletchley Park
