= British Tabulating Machine Company =

The British Tabulating Machine Company (BTM) was a firm which manufactured and sold Hollerith unit record equipment and other data-processing equipment. During World War II, BTM constructed some 200 "bombes", machines used at Bletchley Park to break the German Enigma machine ciphers.

== History ==
The company was formed in 1902 as The Tabulator Limited, after Robert Porter obtained the rights to sell Herman Hollerith's patented machines from the US Tabulating Machine Company (later to become IBM). During 1907, the company was renamed the "British Tabulating Machine Company Limited". In 1920, the company moved from London to Letchworth, Hertfordshire; it was also at this point that it started manufacturing its own machines, rather than simply reselling Hollerith equipment.

Annual revenues were £6K in 1915, £122K in 1925, and £170K in 1937. In 1916 there were 45 staff; this increased to 132 in 1922, 326 in 1929 and 1,225 in 1939.

In return for the exclusive right to market Hollerith equipment in Britain and the Empire (excluding Canada), BTM paid 25% of its revenues to the American company by way of royalties. This became an ever-increasing burden as the years progressed; BTM attempted to renegotiate the agreement on several occasions, but it was only finally terminated in 1948.

During World War II, BTM was called upon to design and manufacture a machine to assist breaking the German Enigma machine ciphers. This machine, known as a bombe, was initially conceived by Alan Turing, but the actual machine was designed by BTM chief engineer Harold 'Doc' Keen, who had led the company's engineering department throughout the 1930s. The project was codenamed "CANTAB". The project was managed by computing pioneer Dora Metcalf until 1942. By the end of the European war, over two hundred bombes had been built and installed.

== HEC computer ==
BTM built a valve based computer called the Hollerith Electronic Computer (HEC). The first model (HEC 1) was built in 1951, an example is held by the Birmingham Museum. BTM went on to develop the HEC 2, 2M and 4 models, eventually building more than 100. The machines had a 2 kilobyte drum memory and 1000 valves, and could use punched cards for input and output, or drive a printer. The HEC 4 was also known as the BTM 1201 (or 1202 with a bigger drum) and later as the ICT 1201, and was exported as far as New Zealand.

== Merger ==
In 1959 BTM merged with former rival Powers-Samas to become International Computers and Tabulators Limited (ICT). ICT later became part of International Computers Limited (ICL), which was later taken over by Fujitsu.
