= Joseph Desch =

American inventor (1907-1987)

Joseph Raymond Desch
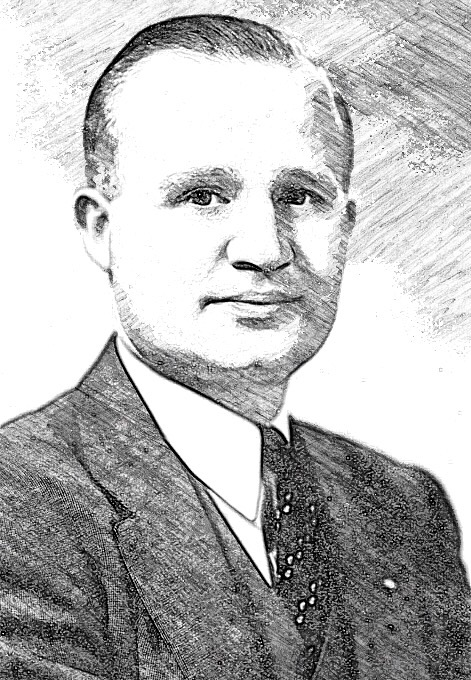
- Born: May 23, 1907; Dayton, Ohio, United States
- Died: August 3, 1987 (aged 80)
- Education: University of Dayton
- Occupations: electrical engineer and inventor

Joseph Raymond Desch (23 May 1907 – 3 August 1987) was an American electrical engineer and inventor. During World War II, he was Research Director of the project to design and manufacture the US Navy version of the bombe, a cryptanalytic machine designed to read communications enciphered by the German Enigma.

== Early life ==
Desch was born in Dayton, Ohio, in 1907 into a family of German descent whose livelihood was blacksmithing and wagon-making. He attended the Catholic elementary school of his neighborhood parish, then won a scholarship to the preparatory (high) school of the University of Dayton. While attending college at University of Dayton, Desch worked evenings as an inspector at Day-Fan Electric in Dayton, supervising radio testing and production.

== Career ==
After graduation in 1929 he began to work at General Motors Radio where he supervised radio testing, and met Robert E. Mumma, who quickly began a friendship which lasted over 50 years. After supervising the liquidation of General Motors Radio in 1933, he conducted teleprinter communications research for Telecom Laboratories, a company financed by Charles Kettering of automotive pioneering fame through General Motors and Delco. Two years later he was hired by Harry Williams to be foreman on the Process Laboratory at the Frigidaire Division of General Motors, once again in Dayton. He then followed Williams to the National Cash Register Company in 1938 to form the innovative Electrical Research Laboratory at the direction of Edward A. Deeds, then president of the company.

At Deeds' direction he conducted research to implement pioneering ideas regarding the use of tubes and circuitry in counting devices, with the idea of developing high speed mathematical computing machines to augment or replace the Company's mechanical machines. The idea of applying electronic counting to calculating mechanisms occurred to him when reading of a thyratron (gas-filled tube) counting ring of five places (5 digits, not five orders) developed by British scientist Dr C. E. Wynn-Williams. As a result Desch's lab received an introduction to and work with the MIT Electrical Engineering Department led by Vannevar Bush.

== Inventions during WWII ==
Beginning in 1940, Desch's lab was awarded several contracts by the National Defense Research Committee. These contracts made use of Desch's research into fast-firing vacuum tubes, including a high-speed thyratron Desch developed. This tube was used in a counter capable of millisecond speed for the University of Chicago Manhattan Project. This was followed by a contract with the OP-20-G section of the Office of Naval Communications. In 1942 his research in the area of electronic counting made him a candidate to evaluate the design for a totally electronic deciphering device created by a group of MIT academics. He gave the opinion that the implementation of the design was not possible, primarily because of the large number of tubes necessary. Believing that the American version of the bombe decryption machine could be built using mechanical and electronic components, and recognizing the National Cash Register Company's capabilities, the Navy moved ahead with a contract. Desch's lab became the United States Naval Computing Machine Laboratory.

In 1943 Desch's team, working in NCR's Building 26, began delivery of completed machines to OP-20-G in Washington. Desch's department was immediately asked to research the problems of breaking Japanese communications. The pressure of cryptanalytic work and the continuing toll of the loss of life in the Pacific theater led to Desch's withdrawal from the project in late 1944. He returned to assist in 1945.

== Electronic calculator ==
In 1946 Desch filed an application for a patent on an electronic calculator designed by him and Bob Mumma, as part of an application initiated in March 1940. This brought about three interferences filed in the US Patent Office between their application and one by Arthur Dickinson of IBM.

Eventually these were settled in favor of Desch, in part because he proved Dickinson's design unworkable, and gave Desch and Mumma the first patent on the modern digital computer. His career after this point was noteworthy, and he was especially proud in later years of his work with Bob Mumma in the development of the 1959 NCR 304, NCR's first completely solid state computer. An earlier fully transistorised computer, the Harwell CADET, had been in operation since February 1955 and was itself preceded by the 1953 Manchester Transitor Computer, whose computing circuitry was fully solid state but relied on valves for some high powered circuitry and was developed into the Metrovick 950. He continued to be an integral part of NCR until his retirement in 1972.

== Awards ==
Desch was awarded the Medal for Merit by President Harry S. Truman July 16, 1947.

Desch was a 2011 inductee to the NSA/CSS Hall of Honor.

Desch was a 2017 recipient of the University of Dayton Distinguished Alumnus Award.

== IEEE Joe Desch Innovation Award ==
This Award was instituted by the Engineers Club in 2008 to honor Desch's legacy. The next year its stewardship was handed over to Deborah Anderson, Desch's daughter. Since 2013 she has been coordinating the award process with the Dayton Section of the IEEE to bring an added importance to the Award.

The recipients so far are:

- 2008: John Janning
- 2009: Dr. Peter T. Brody
- 2010: Drs. Ken Jordan and John Birden
- 2011: Whitfield Diffie
- 2013: Dr. Jacek M. Zurada
- 2015: Dr. George B. Purdy
- 2017: Dr. Daniel Both

== Patents ==
- 2,177,133. Measuring Instrument. Filing date: Nov 25, 1936. Issue date: Oct 24, 1939. Inventor: Joseph. R. Desch, Dayton, Ohio. Assignee: Commonwealth Engineering Co.
- 2,399,473. Electronic Devices. Filing date: Aug 20, 1941. Issue date: Apr 30, 1946. Inventors: Joseph R. Desch and Robert E. Mumma, assignors to The National Cash Register Company
- 2,401,621. Electronic Accumulator. Filing date: Dec 31, 1941. Issue date: Jun 1946. Inventors: J. R. Desch and Lawrence D. Kilheffer, assignors to The National Cash Register Company
- 2,404,697. Calculating Device. Filing date: Mar 21, 1942. Issue date: Jul 23, 1946. Inventors: J. R. Desch and Robert E. Mumma, assignors to The National Cash Register Company
- 2,451,812. Electron Tube Variable Impulse Transmitter. Filing date: Sep 16, 1942. Issue date: Oct 19, 1948. Inventors: Joseph R. Desch, Ernest V. Gulden and Robert E. Mumma, assignors to The National Cash Register Company
- 2,462,613. Communication System. Filing date: Sep 16, 1942. Issue date: Feb 22, 1949. Inventors: J. R. Desch, Ernest V. Gulden, and Robert E. Mumma, assignors to The National Cash Register Company
- 2,419,485. Electronic Device. Filing date: Jun 3, 1943. Issue date: Apr 22, 1947. Inventors: Joseph B. Desch and Robert E. Mumma, assignors to The National Cash Register Company
- 2,467,257. Electronic Remote Control Device. Filing date: May 11, 1944. Issue date: Apr 12, 1949. Inventors: J. R. Desch and Ernest V. Gulden, assignors to The National Cash Register Company
- 2,595,045. Calculating Machine. Filing date: March 20, 1940. Issue date: Apr 29, 1952. Inventors: J. R. Desch and Robert E. Mumma, assignors to The National Cash Register Company
- 2,644,087. Electronic Impulse Generator. Filing date: Dec 4, 1951. Issue date: Jun 30, 1953. Inventor: J. R. Desch, assignor to The National Cash Register Company
- 2,644,110. Filing date: Feb 20, 1952. Issue date: Jun 30, 1953. Inventor: Joseph R. Desch, assignor to The National Cash Register Company
- 2,717,334. Filing date: Apr 21, 1953. Issue date: Sept. 6, 1955. Inventor: Joseph R. Desch, assignor to The National Cash Register Company
- 2,871,408. Filing date: Apr 21, 1953. Issue date: Jan 27, 1959. Inventor: Joseph R. Desch, assignor to The National Cash Register Company

== See also ==
- Bombe
- OP-20-G
- Joseph Wenger
- Edward A. Deeds
- Vannevar Bush
- National Defense Research Committee
- National Security Agency
- Harold Keen
