= History of Polish intelligence services =

This article covers the history of Polish Intelligence services dating back to the Polish–Lithuanian Commonwealth.

== Commonwealth ==
Though the first official Polish government service entrusted with espionage, intelligence and counter-intelligence was not formed until 1918, Kingdom of Poland and later the Polish–Lithuanian Commonwealth had developed networks of informants in neighbouring countries. Envoys and ambassadors had also gathered intelligence, often using bribery. Such agents included the 17th-century Polish poet Jan Andrzej Morsztyn.

Polish kings and Polish–Lithuanian military commanders (hetmans) such as Stanisław Koniecpolski maintained intelligence networks. The hetmans were responsible for intelligence-gathering in the Ottoman Empire, its vassal states and disputed territories such as Wallachia, Moldavia and Transylvania. Intelligence networks also operated in Muscovy and among the restless Cossacks.

In 1683, during the Battle of Vienna, the Polish merchant-spy Jerzy Franciszek Kulczycki secured a promise of military assistance for Vienna, besieged by the Turkish forces of Kara Mustafa Pasha, and thus facilitated the victory of a Christian European coalition led by Polish King Jan III Sobieski. Kulczycki is reported to have received a reward for his services: the Turks' supplies of coffee beans and establishment of Vienna's first coffee house.

== Partitions ==
During the period when Poland had been partitioned (beginning in 1772, until 1918) by three adjacent empires, intelligence played an important role in patriotic Poles' surveillance of their occupiers and in their planning and conduct of successive Polish uprisings.

== 1914–1918 ==
In 1914, Józef Piłsudski created the Polish Military Organization, an intelligence and special-operations organization which worked alongside the Polish Legions. As such, it was independent of Austro-Hungary and loyal to Piłsudski and to a future independent Poland.

== 1918–1921 ==
Immediately upon achieving independence in 1918, Poland established armed forces. Reflecting the influence of the French Military Mission to Poland, the Polish General Staff was divided into divisions entrusted with specific tasks:

1. Oddział I (Division I) – Organization and mobilization;
2. Oddział II (Division II) – Intelligence and counterintelligence;
3. Oddział III (Division III) – Training and operations;
4. Oddział IV (Division IV) – Quartermaster.

Division II (colloquially, "Dwójka," "Two") was formed in October 1918, even before Poland had declared her independence. Initially called the "General Staff Information Department," Division II was divided into sections (sekcje):

- Sekcja I – Reconnaissance and close intelligence;
- Sekcja II
  - IIa (East) – Offensive intelligence for Bolshevik Russia, Lithuania, the Belarusian People's Republic, Ukraine and Galicia;
  - IIb (West) – Offensive intelligence for Austria, Germany, France and the United Kingdom;
- Sekcja III – General intelligence and surveillance abroad (East and West);
- Sekcja IV – Preparation of a front-line bulletin;
- Sekcja V – Contacts with military and civilian authorities;
- Sekcja VI – Contacts with attachés in Berlin, Vienna, Budapest, Moscow and Kiev;
- Sekcja VII – Ciphers (i.e., cryptology).

An extensive network of domestic and foreign informants developed rapidly. This was due to Poland's poor economic situation, itself the result of over a century of foreign occupation. In the 19th and early 20th centuries, Poland's economic and political situation had forced hundreds of thousands to emigrate. With the advent of Polish independence, many émigrés offered their services to Polish intelligence agencies. Other Poles who had been living in the former Russian Empire and were now making their way home through war-torn Russia, provided priceless intelligence on the logistics, order of battle and status of the parties in the Russian Civil War.

In Western Europe (especially in Germany, France and Belgium) the Polish diaspora often formed the backbone of heavy industry; some one million people of Polish descent lived in the Ruhr Valley alone. Many of these provided intelligence on industrial production and economic conditions.

After the outbreak of the Polish-Soviet War in early 1919, intelligence from the east proved vital to Poland's survival against a far superior enemy. A separate organization was formed within Polish Intelligence, taking over most intelligence duties for the duration of the war. This was a Biuro Wywiadowcze (Intelligence Bureau) comprising seven departments:

1. Organisation;
2. Offensive Intelligence "A";
3. Offensive Intelligence "B";
4. Offensive Intelligence "C";
5. Defensive Intelligence;
6. Internal propaganda;
7. Counterintelligence.

The fourth department, Offensive Intelligence "C", became the most developed because it carried out all the duties connected with "front-line" reconnaissance and intelligence, as well as "long-range" intelligence and surveillance in countries surrounding Bolshevik Russia, including Siberia (still in the hands of the White Russians), Turkey, Persia, China, Mongolia and Japan.

The third department, Offensive Intelligence "B," controlled an intelligence network in European Russia.

Additional intelligence was obtained from Russian defectors and prisoners of war who crossed the Polish lines in their thousands, especially after the 1920 Battle of Warsaw.

== 1921–1939 ==
After the Polish–Soviet War and the Treaty of Riga, Polish Intelligence had to restructure to cope with new challenges. Though Poland had won most of her border conflicts (most notably the war with Russia and the Greater Poland Uprising of 1918–19 against Germany), her international situation was unenviable. By mid-1921, Section II had been restructured into three main departments, each overseeing a number of offices:

- Organization Department:

1. Organization;
2. Training;
3. Personnel;
4. Finances;
5. Polish ciphers and codes, communication, and foreign press.

- Information Department:

1. East;
2. West;
3. North;
4. South;
5. Statistics office;
6. Nationalities and minorities;

- Intelligence Department:

1. Intelligence technology;
2. Central agents' bureau;
3. Counterintelligence;
4. Foreign cryptography (Biuro Szyfrów);
5. Radio intelligence and wire-tapping.

Until the late 1930s the Soviet Union was seen as the most likely aggressor and Poland's main adversary. Section II developed an extensive network of agents within Poland's eastern neighbor and other adjoining countries. In the early 1920s Polish intelligence began developing a network for "offensive intelligence." The Eastern Office (Referat "Wschód") had several dozen bureaus, mostly attached to Polish consulates in Moscow, Kiev, Leningrad, Kharkov and Tbilisi.

Short-range reconnaissance was carried out by the Border Defense Corps, created in 1924. On a number of occasions, soldiers crossed the border disguised as smugglers, partisans or bandits. They gathered information on the disposition of Soviet troops and the morale of the Soviet populace. At the same time, Soviet forces carried out analogous missions on Polish soil. The situation finally stabilized in 1925; however, such missions continued to occur occasionally.

Polish Intelligence produced fairly accurate pictures of the capabilities of Poland's main potential adversaries—Germany and the Soviet Union. Nonetheless, this information was of little avail when war came in September 1939. Good intelligence could not offset the overwhelming superiority of the German and Soviet armed forces. The conquest of Poland took four weeks—too short a time for intelligence services to make a significant contribution. With Poland conquered, her intelligence services had to evacuate their headquarters to allied French and British territories.

== 1939–1945 ==
Until 1939 Polish intelligence services did not, as a rule, collaborate with the intelligence services of other countries with the exception of Imperial Japan. A partial exception was also France, Poland's closest ally; even then cooperation was lukewarm, with neither side sharing their most precious secrets. An important exception was the long-term collaboration between France's Gustave Bertrand and Poland's Cipher Bureau, headed by Gwido Langer. The situation only began to change in 1939, when war appeared certain and Britain and France entered into a formal military alliance with Poland. The most important result of the subsequent information-sharing was the disclosure to France and Britain of Polish techniques and equipment for breaking German Enigma machine ciphers.

The initial break into the Enigma ciphers had been made in late 1932 by mathematician Marian Rejewski, working for the Polish General Staff's Cipher Bureau. His work was facilitated, perhaps decisively, by intelligence provided by Bertrand. With the help of fellow mathematicians Henryk Zygalski and Jerzy Różycki, Rejewski developed techniques to decrypt German Enigma-enciphered messages on a regular and timely basis.

Six-and-a-half years after the initial Polish decryption of Enigma ciphers, French and British intelligence representatives were briefed on Polish achievements at a trilateral conference held at Cipher Bureau facilities in the Kabaty Woods, just south of Warsaw, on July 26, 1939, barely five weeks before the outbreak of World War II. This formed the basis for early Enigma decryption by the British at Bletchley Park, northwest of London. Without the head start provided by Poland, British reading of Enigma encryptions might have been delayed several years, if it would have gotten off the ground at all.

Key Polish Cipher Bureau personnel escaped from Poland on September 17, 1939, on the Soviet Union's entry into eastern Poland, and eventually reached France. There, at "PC Bruno" outside Paris, they resumed cracking Enigma ciphers through the "Phony War" (October 1939 – May 1940). Following the fall of northern France to the Germans, the Polish-French-Spanish cryptological organization, sponsored by French Major Gustave Bertrand, continued its work at "Cadix" in the Vichy "Free Zone" until it was occupied by German forces in November 1942.

After the 1939 invasion of Poland, practically all of the General Staff's Section II (Intelligence) command apparatus managed to escape to Romania and soon reached France and Britain. Reactivating agent networks throughout Europe, they immediately began cooperating with French and British intelligence agencies. After the subsequent fall of France, most of Section II ended up in Britain.

At that time Britain was in a difficult situation, badly in need of intelligence from occupied Europe after rapid German advances had disrupted its networks and put German forces into areas where Britain had few agents. Following the personal intervention of Churchill and Sikorski in September 1940, cooperation between British and Polish intelligence organizations entered a new phase.

The Poles placed their Section II at the disposal of the British, but as a quid pro quo requested and obtained (at that time without any reservations) the right to use, without British oversight, their own ciphers which they had developed in France. The Poles were the only Allied country that was given this unique status, though as the war progressed it was challenged by some agencies of the British government. Due to support from members of the British Special Operations Executive, the Poles kept their ciphers to the end of hostilities.

In the first half of 1941 Polish agents in France supplied Britain with intelligence on U-boat movements from French Atlantic ports. The Polish network in France grew to 1,500 members and, before and during Operation Overlord, supplied vital information about the German military in France. Agents working in Poland in the spring of 1941 supplied extensive intelligence about German preparations to invade the Soviet Union (Operation Barbarossa).

Agency Africa was set up in July 1941 in Algiers by Mieczyslaw Zygfryd Slowikowski, Lt. Col. Gwido Langer and Major Maksymilian Ciężki; using the codename "Rygor" (Polish for "Rigor"). Their information was used by the Americans and British to plan the amphibious Operation Torch landings in North Africa in November 1942, the first large-scale Allied landings of the war.

Polish spies also documented German atrocities being perpetrated at Auschwitz (Witold Pilecki's report) and elsewhere in Poland against Jewish and non-Jewish populations. Polish intelligence gave the British crucial information on Germany's secret-weapons projects, including the V-1 and V-2 rockets, enabling Britain to set back these German programs by bombing the main development facility at Peenemünde in 1943. Poland's networks supplied the western Allies with intelligence on nearly all aspects of the German war effort. Of 45,770 reports received by British intelligence during the war, nearly half (22,047) came from Polish agents.

By early 1944, western Allied intelligence policy shifted towards strengthening links with the Japanese, Swedes, Hungarian and Finnish intelligence services. Of these, Poland had existing to the Japanese from before the war. The SOE planted Polish agents disguised as British Liaison Officers in operations Desford and Windproof to strengthen intelligence gathering and coordinate with Hungarian and Slovak groups in spite of the imminent Soviet occupation.

On March 15, 1946, Section II was officially disbanded, and its archives were taken over by Britain. At Section II's dissolution, it had 170 officers and 3,500 agents, excluding headquarters staff. Very likely at least some of the Polish agents continued working directly for Britain during the Cold War.

The Polish intelligence contribution to Britain's war effort was kept secret due to Cold War exigencies. In later years, as official British histories were released, the Polish intelligence role barely rated a mention. Only when British wartime decryption of Enigma ciphers was made public in the 1970s, did a Polish contribution begin to become known; even then, however, the early versions published in Britain (and some versions even to the end of the 20th century) claimed that Polish intelligence had only been able to steal a German Enigma machine. The truth, which had previously been disclosed in Bertrand's book and would later be detailed in papers by Marian Rejewski (who had survived the war and lived to 1980), made slow headway against British and American obfuscations, mendacities, and fabrications. (Note: Christopher Kasparek has argued that the western Allies did themselves a disservice in first keeping secret for three decades the major contribution that reading of German ciphers made to Allied victory, and then claiming for themselves all the glory of the Enigma-breaking achievement; for this has led a couple of subsequent generations of western politicians and military officers to, in the words of F.W. Winterbotham, "be fooled by the spate of televisions films and propagands which has made [World War II] seem like some great triumphant epic," and thus underestimate the hazards of later conflicts.) The Polish Enigma-breaking effort had been much more sophisticated than those English-language accounts made out, and had in fact relied largely on mathematical analysis. Historians' efforts to gain access to documentation of other Polish intelligence operations met with British stonewalling and with claims that the pertinent Polish archives had been destroyed by the British.

Polish intelligence supplied valuable intelligence to the Allies; 48% of all reports received by the British secret services from continental Europe between 1939 and 1945 came from Polish sources. The total number of those reports is estimated at about 80,000, and 85% of them were deemed high or better quality. Despite Poland becoming occupied, the Polish intelligence network not only survived but grew rapidly, and near the end of the war had over 1,600 registered agents.

The Western Allies had limited intelligence assets in Central and Eastern Europe, and the extensive Polish intelligence network in place proved to be a major asset, even described as "the only allied intelligence assets on the Continent" following the French capitulation. According to Marek Ney-Krwawicz, for the Western Allies, the intelligence provided by the Home Army was considered to be the best source of information on the Eastern Front.

The secret service of the Polish Home Army also collaborated extensively with Japan during WW2, sharing information on both the Nazis and the Soviet Union, and receiving both funds and equipment from Japan. Weapons, ammo and medical supplies were smuggled into occupied Poland from Japan, through neutral nations, using Japanese diplomatic offices along the way. Chiune Sugihara, a Japanese diplomat in Lithuania, exchanged information with members of the Polish resistance and issued them Japanese transit visas in 1940.

There was also an Estezet network based out of New York City from 1941 during WWII.

== 1945–1989 ==
=== Civilian branches ===
On occupying Poland and installing a puppet government, the Soviet Union created new Polish intelligence and internal-security agencies. The Soviet special services had begun training Polish officers as early as 1943. That year, some 120 Poles had begun training at an NKVD school in Kuybyshev (now Samara). At the same time, in NKVD-NKGB schools all over the USSR, hundreds of Germans, Romanians, Czechoslovaks and Bulgarians had also undergone the same training in order to prepare them for work in future special services in their respective countries.

In July 1944 in Moscow the temporary Polish puppet government was established by the name of the Polish Committee of National Liberation (Polski Komitet Wyzwolenia Narodowego), or PKWN. The PKWN was organized as thirteen departments (resorty). One of them was the Department of Public Security (Resort Bezpieczeństwa Publicznego), or RBP, headed by long-time Polish communist Stanisław Radkiewicz. The largest and the most important department in the RBP, Department 1, was responsible for counter-espionage and headed by Roman Romkowski. By September 1945 Department 1 had become so large that three additional departments were created, as well as two separate sections. By the close of 1944, the Department of Public Security totaled 3000 employees.

On December 31, 1944, the PKWN was joined by several members of the Polish government in exile, among them Stanisław Mikołajczyk. It was then transformed into the Provisional Government of Republic of Poland (Rząd Tymczasowy Republiki Polskiej, or RTRP), and the departments were renamed as ministries.

The Ministry of Public Security was responsible for both intelligence and counter-espionage, as well as surveillance of citizens and suppression of dissent. They generally did not employ former officers of the "Dwojka" or follow the traditions of pre-war Polish intelligence services. Personnel were recruited for their "political reliability". New formations were trained by Soviet NKVD experts. Additionally, and especially in the early years (1945–49), Soviet officers in Polish uniforms overlooked their operations. After Joseph Stalin's death in 1953 and the later defection of Col. Józef Światło, the Ministry of Public Security was cancelled and replaced by two separate administrations - the Committee for Public Security (Polish: Komitet do Spraw Bezpieczeństwa Publicznego, or Kds.BP) and the Ministry of Internal Affairs.

The Kds.BP was responsible for intelligence and government protection and. From September 3, 1955, to 28 November 1956, the Main Directorate of Information of the Polish Army (Główny Zarząd Informacji Wojska Polskiego), which was responsible for the military police and counter-espionage agency, was also controlled by the Kds.BP. The MSW was responsible for the supervision of local governments, Militsiya, correctional facilities, fire rescue and the border and internal guards.

The next big changes came in 1956. The Committee for Public Security was abolished and the Ministry of Internal Affairs took over their responsibilities. The MSW assumed control of the political police, under the Służba Bezpieczeństwa.

From 1956 to the fall of communism in Poland the MSW was one of the biggest and strongest administrations. During this period its responsibilities included intelligence, counter-espionage, anti-state activity (SB), government protection, confidential communications, supervision of the local governments, Milicja Obywatelska, correctional facilities, and fire rescue. The Ministry of Internal Affairs was divided into departments. The most important of these were the first second and third departments. The first dealt with foreign operations and intelligence gathering, the second with spy activities both by Poland and other countries and the third was responsible for anti-state activities and the protection of the country's secrets.

With the exception of its own departments and sections, the MSW also had control over the Milicja Obywatelska (Komenda Główna Milicji Obywatelskiej or KG/MO), fire rescue (Komenda Główna Straży Pożarnych or KG/SP), territorial anti-aircraft defense, (Komenda Główna Terenowej Obrony Przeciwlotniczej KG/TOP), management of geodesy and cartography, (Główny Zarząd Geodezji i Kartografii) and health services (Centralny Zarząd Służby Zdrowia). Ministry of Internal Affairs also had control over the command of the Internal Security Corps. (Dowództwo Korpusu Bezpieczeństwa Wewnętrznego or KBW), command of the Border Protection Forces, and management of Information of Internal Troops (Zarząd Informacji Wojsk Wewnetrznych). Through the 1980s the MSW had 24,390 staff in Security Services, 62,276 in the Citizen's Militsiya, 12,566 in Motorized Reserves of the Citizens' Militia (Zmotoryzowane Odwody Milicji Obywatelskiej, or ZOMO), 20,673 in Administratively-Economic Units (Jednostki administracyjno-gospodarcze) and 4,594 in ministry schools, not including students.

=== Military branches ===
The first military special services in Poland after World War II were created in 1943 as part of the Polish military in the USSR. First organ that dealt with military counterespionage was called Directorate of Information by the commander-in-chief of the Polish Army (Zarząd Informacji Naczelnego Dowódcy Wojska Polskiego, or ZI NDWP). On November 30, 1944, the commander-in-chief of the Polish Army, general Michał Rola-Żymierski, transformed the ZI NDWP into the Main Directorate of Information of the Polish Army (Główny Zarząd Informacji Wojska Polskiego, or GZI WP) in his 95th order. From 30 November 1950, the GZI WP became the Main Directorate of Information of the Ministry of Defense (Główny Zarząd Informacji Ministerstwa Obrony Narodowej, or GZI MON). In September 1955 GZI MON became part of the Committee for Public Security, which was the successor of Ministerstwo Bezpieczeństwa Publicznego, more commonly known as the Urząd Bezpieczeństwa or UB, and the name was changed to the Main Directorate of Information of the Committee for Public Security, or GZI KdsBP. In November 1956 the GZI Kds.BP separated from the Committee for Public Security, and returned to its previous role, becoming again the Main Directorate of Information of the Ministry of Defense. After the reform instituted by Władysław Gomułka in 1956, and the role the GZI played in repressions and executions, the Main Directorate of Information of Ministry of Defense was cancelled in 1957 and replaced by the Military Internal Service (Wojskowa Służba Wewnętrzna, or WSW). The WSW continuously operated as the main military police and counterespionage service until the fall of communism in Poland.

The first Polish Military Intelligence after World War II was the Second Section of General Staff of the Polish People's Army (Oddział II Sztabu Generalnego Ludowego Wojska Polskiego, or Odział II Szt Gen LWP) and bore the same name as its precursor from before the war. Odział II Szt Gen WP was established on July 18, 1945, but its origins can be traced to May 1943, when the first reconnaissance company was created in Polish Army units in the USSR. Between July 1947 and June 5, 1950, the Second Section of General Staff of the Polish People's Army operated within the structure of the Ministry of Public Security together with the civilian intelligence branch as Department VII. On June 5, 1950, it returned to the Ministry of Defense. The first head of Odział II Szt Gen WP was Colonel Gieorgij Domeradzki. In November 1945 this position was occupied by General Wacław Komar, and between October 1950 and March 1951 by Soviet officer Konstantin Kahnikov. The last commander of the Second Section of General Staff of the Polish People's Army was Igor Suchacki.

On November 15, 1951, Polish Defence Minister Konstantin Rokossovsky (in his 88th order) transformed the Second Section of General Staff of the Polish People's Army to Second Directorate of General Staff of the Polish Army (Zarząd II Sztabu Generalnego Wojska Polskiego). Internal organization was transformed from sections to directorates and intelligence work among the United States, Great Britain, the Federal Republic of Germany, France, the Netherlands, Belgium, Switzerland and Austria was expanded to countries such as Norway, Spain, Portugal, Greece, Turkey and Israel. In 1990 the Second Directorate of General Staff of the Polish Army was join with the Military Internal Service (Wojskowa Służba Wewnętrzna, or WSW), in order to have intelligence and counter-intelligence working under one structure as the Second Directorate for Intelligence and Counter-intelligence (Zarząd II Wywiadu i Kontrwywiadu). In 1991 the Second Directorate for Intelligence and Counter-intelligence was transformed into Military Information Services (Wojskowe Służby Informacyjne, or WSI), and continues to function under this name.

== 1989–present ==
After the changes of 1989 the Służba Bezpieczeństwa was disbanded by the first free government under the prime minister, Tadeusz Mazowiecki. A new agency, called the State Protection Office (Urząd Ochrony Państwa, or UOP) was formed and staffed mainly by the former SB officers who successfully passed a verification procedure. Its mission was primarily general espionage and intelligence gathering as well as counter-espionage and fighting against high ranked organized crime. It was commanded by a career intelligence officer but was directly supervised by a civilian government official, Coordinator for the Special Services.

Most of the time the agency evaded public attention, although it was dragged into political fighting over appointments of its chiefs, lustration and some perceived failures with organized crime cases. In 2002 the new, post-communist left-wing government reorganized the special services by dividing them into two agencies; the Internal Security Agency (Agencja Bezpieczeństwa Wewnętrznego) and Intelligence Agency (Agencja Wywiadu). The move was widely perceived as a way of cleansing the higher ranks of the officers appointed by previous right-wing governments.

The military intelligence continued to function under a slightly altered name (Wojskowe Służby Informacyjne- Military Information Services) and without much organizational change; at least none that was visible to the general public. The new Polish conservative government declared dissolution of the WSI and creating new services in October 2005, since the agency skipped serious external reforms after the collapse of communism in 1989. Throughout the transformation the WSI were allegedly involved in dubious operations, arms sales to UN-sanctioned states and corruption scandals. In 2006, the WSI was split into Służba Kontrwywiadu Wojskowego and Służba Wywiadu Wojskowego.

=== Notable operations ===
- Operation Simoom, 1990

== Notable personnel ==
- Feliks Ankerstein
- Edmund Charaszkiewicz.
- Roman Czerniawski
- Józef Englicht
- Jan Kowalewski.
- Jerzy Franciszek Kulczycki
- Kazimierz Leski
- Jan Leśniak.
- Stefan Mayer.
- Wiktor Michałowski.
- Tadeusz Pełczyński
- Tadeusz Puszczyński
- Tadeusz Schaetzel
- Zbigniew Siemiątkowski
- Mieczysław Zygfryd Słowikowski.
- Halina Szymańska

== See also ==
- Biuro Szyfrów (Polish General Staff Cipher Bureau)
- History of the Polish Army.
- Stare Kiejkuty, home of military unit 2669; allegedly involved in the CIA's network of extraordinary renditions.
- List of Poles in intelligence
- List of intelligence agencies of Poland

== Sources ==
- Michael Alfred Peszke, The Polish Underground Army, the Western Allies, and the Failure of Strategic Unity in World War II, foreword by Piotr S. Wandycz, Jefferson, North Carolina, McFarland & Company, 2005, ISBN 0-7864-2009-X.
- Władysław Kozaczuk, Enigma: How the German Machine Cipher Was Broken, and How It Was Read by the Allies in World War Two, edited and translated by Christopher Kasparek, Frederick, Maryland, University Publications of America, 1984, ISBN 0-89093-547-5.
- Richard A. Woytak (1979). On the Border of War and Peace: Polish Intelligence and Diplomacy in 1937–1939, and the Origins of the Ultra Secret. Boulder, East European Quarterly, distributed by Columbia University Press, New York. ISBN 0-914710-42-7.
- Edmund Charaszkiewicz, Zbiór dokumentów ppłk. Edmunda Charaszkiewicza (Collection of Documents by Lt. Col. Edmund Charaszkiewicz), opracowanie, wstęp i przypisy (edited, with introduction and notes by) Andrzej Grzywacz, Marcin Kwiecień, Grzegorz Mazur, Kraków, Księgarnia Akademicka, 2000, ISBN 83-7188-449-4.
- Mieczysław Rygor-Słowikowski, In the Secret Service: The Lighting of the Torch, translated by George Słowikowski, London, The Windrush Press, 1988, ISBN 0-900075-40-6.
- Józef Kasparek, Przepust karpacki: tajna akcja polskiego wywiadu (The Carpathian Bridge: a Covert Polish Intelligence Operation), Warsaw, Sigma NOT, 1992, ISBN 83-85001-96-4.
- Paweł Samuś (1998). Akcja Łom: Polskie działania dywersyjne na Rusi Zakarpackiej w świetle dokumenów Oddziału II Sztabu Głównego WP (Operation Crowbar: Polish Diversionary Operations in Transcarpathian Ruthenia in Light of Documents of Section II of the Polish General Staff). Kazimierz Badziak, Giennadij Matwiejew. Warsaw, Adiutor. ISBN 83-86100-31-1.
- Władysław Kozaczuk (1999). Bitwa o tajemnice: służby wywiadowcze Polski i Niemiec, 1918–1939 (Secret Battle: The Intelligence Services of Poland and Germany, 1918–1939). Warsaw, Książka i Wiedza. ISBN 83-05-13083-5.
- Grzegorz Nowik (2004). Zanim złamano Enigmę: Polski radiowywiad podczas wojny z bolszewicką Rosją 1918–1920 (Before Enigma Was Broken: Polish Radio Intelligence during the Polish-Soviet War, 1918–1920). Warsaw, Oficyna Wydawnicza RYTM. ISBN 83-7399-099-2.
- Tessa Stirling; et al. (2005). "vol. I: The Report of the Anglo-Polish Historical Committee". Intelligence Co-operation between Poland and Great Britain during World War II. London, Vallentine Mitchell. ISBN 0-85303-656-X.
- Henryk Piecuch, Brudne gry: ostatnie akcje Służb Specjalnych (seria: "Tajna Historia Polski") [Dirty Games: The Last Special Services Operations ("Secret History of Poland" series)], Warsaw, Agencja Wydawnicza CB, 1998.
