= Richard Woytak =

American historian

- Born: Richard Andrew Woytak; December 18, 1940
- Died: March 6, 1998 (aged 57); Monterey, California, U.S.

Academic work
- Discipline: History
- Sub-discipline: European History

Richard Andrew Woytak (Poland, 18 December 1940 – 6 March 1998, Monterey, California, United States) was a Polish–American historian who specialized in European history of the Interbellum and World War II.

He was the author of the 1979 book, On the Border of War and Peace: Polish Intelligence and Diplomacy in 1937-1939, and the Origins of the Ultra Secret.

== Life ==
Woytak's interest in Polish and European 20th-century history had been stimulated by his family's vicissitudes. He was born in Nazi-occupied western Poland and early lost his mother in a German concentration camp. In 1948 he was brought by his father to the United States, where the family had previously lived from the turn of the 20th century.

In the course of his researches, Woytak interviewed many shapers of 20th-century history, such as Polish cryptologist Marian Rejewski, and met many of its chroniclers, including Władysław Kozaczuk. Woytak's researches contributed to the wealth of documentation found in Kozaczuk's 1984 book on Enigma.

A selection of Woytak's interviews was published posthumously as Werble historii (History's Drumroll), edited by and with introduction by Stanisław Krasucki, illustrated with 36 photographs, Bydgoszcz, Poland, Związek Powstańców Warszawskich w Bydgoszczy, 1999, 240 pp., ISBN 83-902357-8-1. The interviewees were Marian Rejewski, Stefan Mayer, Jan Leśniak, Józef Smoleński, Wacław Jędrzejewicz, Adam Ciołkosz, Kazimierz Smogorzewski, Wiesław Arlet and Janusz Kodrębski.

== Works ==
- "Wywiad z litewskim Wodzem Naczelnym gen. Stasys'em Rastikis'em" ("Interview with Lithuanian Commander in Chief Gen. Stasys Rastikis"), Paris, Zeszyty Historyczne, vol. 261, no. 35 (1976).
- On the Border of War and Peace: Polish Intelligence and Diplomacy in 1937-1939 and the Origins of the Ultra Secret, Boulder, East European Quarterly, New York, distributed by Columbia University Press, 1979, ISBN 0-914710-42-7.
- "The Promethean Movement in Interwar Poland," East European Quarterly, vol. XVIII, no. 3 (September 1984), pp. 273–78.
- Substantial contributions to Władysław Kozaczuk, Enigma: How the German Machine Cipher Was Broken, and How It Was Read in World War Two, edited and translated by Christopher Kasparek, Frederick, Maryland, University Publications of America, 1984.
- "Colonel Kowalewski and the Origins of Polish Code Breaking and Communication Interception," East European Quarterly, vol. XXI, no. 4 (January 1988), pp. 497–500.
- Werble historii (History's Drumroll), Bydgoszcz, 1999, ISBN 83-902357-8-1.

== See also ==
- List of Poles
