= Jan Leśniak =

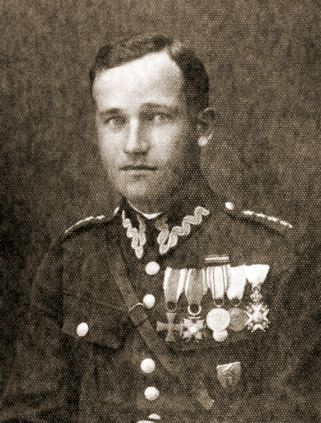
Jan Leśniak

Jan Leśniak (1898 – 1976 in Vienna) was a Polish military intelligence officer in the Interbellum and World War II.

== Career ==
Leśniak was from fall 1935 deputy director of the Polish General Staff's German Office and for a year, from April 1938, its director.

Leśniak in 1976 told historian Richard Woytak that, beginning in fall 1935, he received intelligence whose source he had not been informed of and which in fact came from decryption of German Enigma messages by the Polish General Staff's Cipher Bureau.

Like British and American officers who would during World War II receive Ultra intelligence gleaned from Enigma decrypts, then-Major Leśniak began questioning its reliability. "Some of the information was so important, about [German] mobilizations and so on, that... I questioned [it] in '36 [and was told its source] shortly afterwards." Leśniak was apparently initiated into the secret by Colonel Stefan Mayer, the General Staff's intelligence chief. Henceforth Leśniak was in direct contact with Col. Gwido Langer and Major Maksymilian Ciężki of the Cipher Bureau and with Captain Wiktor Michałowski of the Bureau's German section.

Often, when the Cipher Bureau was missing information or had decrypted half a military unit's or individual's name, Leśniak was able to supply the lacking information.

Leśniak recalled that the decrypts included messages between the German Ministry of War in Berlin and Wehrkreises in Königsberg (Wehrkreis no. 1) and elsewhere, concerning postings, military build-ups and preparations for mobilization. There was less information on the air force, but a great deal on the navy, e.g. movements of naval ships putting out from Kiel and into the Baltic Sea.

The Enigma decrypts helped Polish intelligence build up before the outbreak of World War II a remarkably (95%) complete picture of the German military order of battle and of her mobilization preparations.

Enigma decrypts came into Leśniak's office in varying volume: sometimes several, sometimes a dozen or more, a week. The greatest flow was in 1938. In 1939 there were few decrypts. When Leśniak made inquiries, he learned that the Cipher Bureau was having difficulties with decryption, except for Gestapo and Sicherheitsdienst and some air force messages.

In mid-April 1939, Leśniak turned the German Office over to Lt. Col. Stanisław Bień and formed a Situation Office for wartime service, which he headed to and through the German invasion of Poland in September 1939. Later he would head a German Office at the Polish General Staff in France and in London.

During the 1939 invasion of Poland, according to Leśniak, there was no Enigma intelligence: "When there is no radio monitoring, there are no messages, and you can't work. It was only in France [in late 1939] that this source started up again, after the whole [Cipher Bureau] team... had been turned over to the French [general] staff."

Lt. Col. Leśniak in 1944-1945 served as deputy chief of the Polish General Staff's Section II (intelligence) in Great Britain.

He died after being struck by a motor vehicle while visiting Vienna in 1976.

== See also ==
- History of Polish intelligence services
- List of Poles
