= SWW =

SWW may refer to:

== Businesses and organizations ==
- Służba Wywiadu Wojskowego (founded 2006) Polish intelligence agency, see List of intelligence agencies of Poland
- Sitel (NYSE stock ticker: SWW) voicemail services company
- Shovkoviy Shlyah (IATA airline code: S8; ICAO airline code: SWW) of Ukraine, see List of airline codes (S)
- SUNWAY Intersun Havacilik Anonim Sirketi (ICAO airline code: SWW) of Sweden, see Sunways
- Studio Watts Workshop (founded 1963) in Watts, LA, California, USA

== People ==
- Scott W. Williams (born 1943), American mathematician
- Stephanie Winston Wolkoff (born 1971), American fashion executive

== Places ==
- South West Wales, Wales, United Kingdom
- School Without Walls (Washington, D.C.), anAmerican high school
- Avenger Field, Texas, United States (IATA:SWW)

== Other uses ==
- Second World War (usually WWII)
- Sowa language, once spoken in Vanuatu (ISO 639:sww)

== See also ==
- West southwest
- S2W
- SW2 (disambiguation)
