= Henri Braquenié =

Henri Braquenié (12 December 1896 – 14 December 1975) was an interbellum and World War II French Air Force officer and cryptanalyst.

Braquenié was born in Paris to Charles Louis Braquenié and Jeanne Louise Debard. He attended, with French Major Gustave Bertrand and another French Army officer, the 9–10 January 1939 Paris meeting of French, Polish and British military intelligence officers convened to discuss progress (none had occurred in France or Britain) on decryption of German Enigma ciphers.

Braquenié also participated with Bertrand in the trilateral 25 July 1939 Warsaw meeting at which the Polish Cipher Bureau disclosed its achievements in breaking Enigma ciphers (since December 1932).

During the period of the Phony War (6 October 1939 – 10 May 1940) Braquenié served as deputy to the French chief, Bertrand, of "PC Bruno," the Franco-Polish radio-intelligence and cryptology center outside Paris.

On 3–7 December 1939 Braquenié accompanied the chief of the Polish cryptologic team, Lt. Col. Gwido Langer, to London and Bletchley Park. At Bletchley, Braquenié established the procedures for mutual teleprinter exchange of information, especially of solved daily Enigma keys. In 1975, shortly before his death, he disclosed that, to ensure the absolute security of the information exchanges, the allied cryptologic services used Enigma itself as their cipher. Braquenié, personally responsible for the Bruno-Bletchley correspondence, followed the standard procedure of padding messages with innocuous verbiage, and habitually closed them with a "Heil Hitler!"

Following France's capitulation in June 1940, Braquenié evacuated south to unoccupied, Vichy France with other Bruno staff, and subsequently served at the "Cadix" center that was then established near Uzès, not far from the Mediterranean Sea.

He died in Passy, Haute-Savoie, France, aged 79.
