= SW2 =

SW2 can refer to:

- Samurai Warriors 2
- Sony SmartWatch
- Star Wars: Episode II – Attack of the Clones
- Shadow Warrior 2
- SW2, postcode for Brixton, London, UK, see SW postcode area
- SW2 tram, a class of electric trams modified from the W2 tram by the Melbourne & Metropolitan Tramways Board.
- Farmway LRT station, Singapore

== See also ==
- S2W
- SWII (disambiguation)
- SWW (disambiguation)
- SW (disambiguation)
