= Hans-Thilo Schmidt =

German spy (1888–1943)

- Born: 13 May 1888
- Died: 19 September 1943 (aged 55); Berlin, Germany
- Cause of death: Execution or suicide
- Occupation: Civil servant
- Espionage activity
- Allegiance: France
- Codename: Asché
- Codename: Source D

Hans-Thilo Schmidt (13 May 1888 – 19 September 1943) codenamed Asché or Source D, was a German spy who sold secrets about the Enigma machine to the French during World War II. The materials he provided facilitated Polish mathematician Marian Rejewski's reconstruction of the wiring in the Enigma's rotors and reflector; thereafter the Poles were able to read a large proportion of Enigma-enciphered traffic. He was the younger brother of Wehrmacht general Rudolf Schmidt.

== Selling Enigma secrets ==
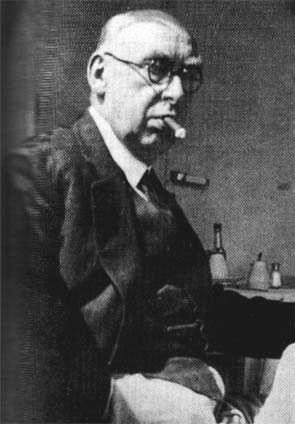
Rodolphe Lemoine, born Rudolf Stallmann (1871–1946), served as his French point of contact as "Rex".

A former officer, Schmidt had been forced to leave the army having suffered from gas during the First World War. His brother, Rudolf Schmidt, secured him a civilian post at the German Armed Forces' cryptographic headquarters, the Cipher Office. Shortly after the military version of the Enigma machine was introduced, he contacted French intelligence and offered to supply information about the new machine. His offer was accepted by Captain Gustave Bertrand of French Intelligence, and he received from the French the codename Asché, and was assigned a contact, the French agent codenamed Rex.

For the next several years, until he left his position in Germany, he met with French agents at various European cities and supplied them copies of the Enigma machine's instruction manual, operating procedures, and lists of key settings. Even with this information, however, French Intelligence was unable to break messages encrypted on the Enigma. Nor were the British cryptologists whom Bertrand contacted able to make any headway.

In December 1932, Bertrand shared intelligence obtained from Asché with the Polish General Staff's Cipher Bureau (Biuro Szyfrów). Mathematician-cryptologist Marian Rejewski had already set up a system of equations describing the operation of the then-new German Army Enigma rotor wirings. The key-settings lists provided by Schmidt helped fill in enough of the unknowns in Rejewski's formulas, allowing him to speedily solve the equations and recover the wirings. That accomplished, the Poles were henceforth able to read Enigma traffic for nearly seven years to the outbreak of World War II and partway into the war, while operating in conjunction with French intelligence in France. In a two-week January 1938 trial, they solved and read about three-quarters of all Wehrmacht (German Armed Forces) Enigma intercepts: a remarkable result, considering that parts of the raw intercepts were garbled or incomplete due to interference [Kozaczuk, Enigma 1984, p. 45].

After the Battle of France, the French agent who had been Schmidt's case officer, a German citizen named Stallmann who went by the name "Rodolphe Lemoine" (fr) and used the codename "Rex," was arrested by the Gestapo and betrayed Schmidt as a French spy. Schmidt was arrested on 1 April 1943, and in September 1943 his daughter Giselle was called on to identify his body; her account (as recounted in Hugh Sebag-Montefiore's book) suggests that Schmidt had committed suicide.

== See also ==
- Ultra (cryptography)
