= Wiktor Michałowski =

Polish army officer

Wiktor Michałowski (1895-1967) was a Polish Army officer who worked at the interbellum Polish Cipher Bureau's German section, B.S.-4. Reportedly he participated, as a lieutenant, in the initial, unsuccessful Polish attempts to break the German Enigma cipher, along with then-Lieutenant Maksymilian Ciężki and civilian civil engineer Antoni Palluth.

From 1936, Captain Michałowski was an Enigma-intelligence contact of Major Jan Leśniak of the Polish General Staff's German Office.

After Germany invaded Poland in September 1939, then-Major Michałowski made his way to France, where he became part of PC Bruno's Polish Team Z, which broke German ciphers, including Enigma. After France's capitulation to Germany in June 1940, he served with his Polish cryptologist comrades at Polish intelligence Station 300 (French codename: "Cadix") near Uzès in southern, Vichy France's "Free Zone."

After Germany occupied Vichy France in November 1942, Major Michałowski escaped to Britain.

He died on January 6, 1967.
