= Estezet =

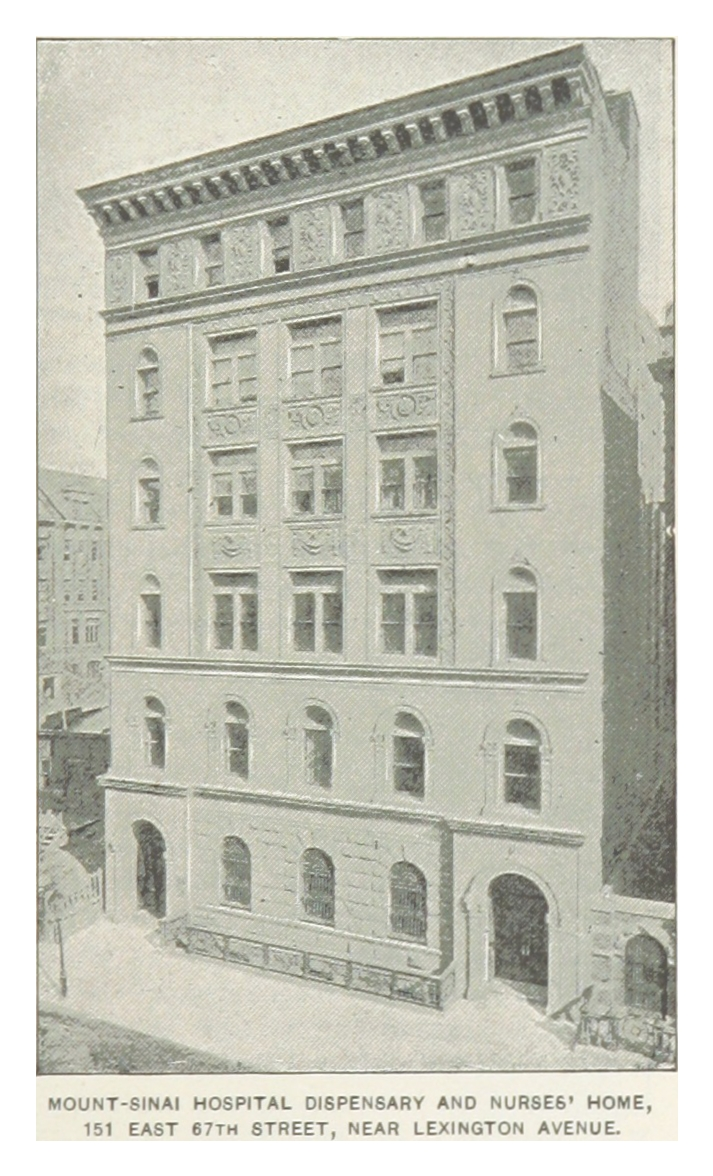
Site of former "Estezet" headquarters in New York City(1941-1945)

Estezet (STZ) was the code name of a Polish intelligence service branch established in New York City in August 1941 when a cooperative agreement was signed between Polish and American spy services.

== History ==
The branch was set up by Section II (Oddział II) of the General Staff of the Polish Armed Forces. The agency worked in secret at the General Consulate of the Second Polish Republic in New York. Its operational area was the United States, Canada, Brazil, Argentina, Chile, Paraguay, Uruguay, Peru, and Bolivia. The goals of the agency were to observe the military, political situations and the development of the Polish diaspora in countries in the Americas. The agency paid particular attention to agitation and penetration by Communism and its agents with special regard to the United States, Canada and Polish affairs. It also concerned itself with the state, development and political situation of Ukrainian communities and the analysis of Central and Eastern European immigrant press (Polish, German, Ukrainian, Czech, Slovak, Lithuanian, and Jewish).

== Archives ==
A digitized collection of Estezet documents is available at the Józef Piłsudski Institute of America. It was given to the Institute by Marian Chodacki, a former Estezet operative, after he entrusted it in the care of at the Sisters of the Holy Family of Nazareth in Phildadelphia in the event of his death.

== See also ==
- History of Polish intelligence services
