= List of intelligence agencies of Poland =

List of intelligence agencies of Poland:

== Second Polish Republic (1918-1939) ==
- Biuro Wywiadowcze Ministerstwa Spraw Wewnętrznych
- Wydział Informacyjny Ministerstwa Spraw Wewnętrznych
- Inspektorat Defensywy Politycznej at the National Police Headquarters (przy Komendzie Głównej Policji Państwowej (IDP KGPP)_
- Oddział II Sztabu Generalnego WP – military intelligence and counterintelligence
  - Biuro Szyfrów (Cipher Bureau) – radio espionage, cryptography

== World War II ==
- Oddział II Sztabu Naczelnego Wodza PSZ
- Oddział II Komendy Głównej SZP/ZWZ/AK

== People's Polish Republic (1944-1990) ==
- Resort Bezpieczeństwa Publicznego, RBP – (1944–1945)
- Ministerstwo Bezpieczeństwa Publicznego, MBP – (1945–1954) (Ministry of Public Security)
- Komitet do spraw Bezpieczeństwa Publicznego, Kds.BP – (1954–1956) (Intelligence, Counterintelligence and Secret Police)
- Ministerstwo Spraw Wewnętrznych (Ministry of Internal Affairs)
  - Służba Bezpieczeństwa Ministerstwa Spraw Wewnętrznych (Security Service of the Ministry of Internal Affairs)
    - Departament I Ministerstwa Spraw Wewnętrznych - foreign
    - Departament II Ministerstwa Spraw Wewnętrznych - counterespionage
    - Biuro Studiów Służby Bezpieczeństwa MSW - (1982–1989) - focusing on domestic opposition
- Oddział II Sztabu Generalnego Wojska Polskiego (LWP) (1945–1951) (Military intelligence)
- Zarząd II Sztabu Generalnego Wojska Polskiego (1951–1990) (Military intelligence)
  - Agenturalny Wywiad Operacyjny, AWO
- Główny Zarząd Informacji, GZI (WP/MON/Kds.BP) (1944–1957)
- Wojskowa Służba Wewnętrzna MON, WSW MON (1957–1990) (Internal Military Service)

== Poland (1990-2019) ==
- Agencja Bezpieczeństwa Wewnętrznego (2002–present) (Internal Security Agency, ABW), since 2002
- Agencja Wywiadu (2002–present) (Intelligence Agency, AW), since 2002
- Centralne Biuro Antykorupcyjne (2006–present) (Central Anticorruption Bureau, CBA) - focused on investigations connected with all kinds of financial crimes.
- Służba Kontrwywiadu Wojskowego - from 2006 (SKW) - military counterespionage
- Służba Wywiadu Wojskowego - from 2006 (SWW) - military espionage
- General Police Headquarters of Poland (KGP) (criminal intelligence) since 1990
  - Bureau of Criminal Intelligence and Information (each of the Voivodeship Police Commands has also a corresponding department) since 2016
  - Centralne Biuro Śledcze Policji (CBŚP) (Central Investigations Bureau of the Police) since 2002
- General Inspector of Financial Information (GIIF) (financial intelligence) since 2005
- Wywiad Skarbowy (1998–2017) (Internal Revenue Intelligence of the Ministry of Finance), replaced by the Tax and Customs Service
- Urząd Ochrony Państwa (Office for State Protection, UOP) - replaced on 29 June 2002 by ABW and AW,
- Wojskowe Służby Informacyjne (Military Information Services, WSI) replaced on 30 September 2006 by SKW and SWW
- Tax and Customs Service (SCS) (tax intelligence) since 2017
- National Centre for Cryptology (2013–2019) (military SIGINT and cryptology), replaced by the National Centre for Cyberspace Security
- Narodowe Centrum Bezpieczeństwa Cyberprzestrzeni (NCBC - National Centre for Cyberspace Security) (military SIGINT, cyberwarfare and cryptology) since 2019

== Poland (2019-present) ==
- Agencja Wywiadu (AW) (Foreign Intelligence Agency, also principal SIGINT and IMINT agency)
- Agencja Bezpieczeństwa Wewnętrznego (ABW) (Internal Security Agency - domestic and counter-intelligence, counter-terrorism, counter-extremism, domestic SIGINT)
- Służba Wywiadu Wojskowego (SWW) (Military Intelligence Service including SIGINT and IMINT)
- Służba Kontrwywiadu Wojskowego (SKW) (Military Counter-intelligence Service including SIGINT)
- Centralne Biuro Antykorupcyjne (CBA) (Central Anticorruption Bureau)
- General Police Headquarters of Poland (KGP) (criminal intelligence)
  - Biuro Wywiadu i Informacji Kryminalnych (BWiIK) (Bureau of Criminal Intelligence and Information)
    - Each of the Voivodeship Police Commands has also a corresponding department
  - Centralne Biuro Śledcze Policji (CBŚP) (Central Investigations Bureau of the Police)
- Zarząd Operacyjno-Śledczy Komendy Głównej Straży Granicznej (ZOŚ KGSG) (Operations and Investigations Directorate of the Border Guard Headquarters) - border, immigration, air traffic and related criminal intelligence
- Służba Ochrony Państwa (SOP) - intelligence concerning personal security of principal state officials
- Straż Marszałkowska (SM) - intelligence concerning security of the houses of Parliament
- Criminal Directorate of the Military Gendarmerie Headquarters (ZK KGŻW)
- Tax and Customs Service (SCS) (tax intelligence)
- General Inspector of Financial Information (GIIF) (financial intelligence)

Other contemporary military units involved in:

- IMINT
  - Polish IMINT Centre (ORO)
  - 12th Unmanned Aerial Vehicles Base (12.BBSP)
  - Military Unit NIL "Brigadier General August Emil Fieldorf «Nil»" (JW NIL)
- SIGINT
  - Reconnaissance Group of 3rd Ship Flotilla (gOR 3.FO)
  - Centre for Radioelectronic Combat Reconnaissance and Support ″Lieutenant Colonel Jan Kowalewski″ (CRiWWRE)
  - 2th Przasnysz Radioelectronic Reconnaissance Regiment (2.ORel)
  - 6th Oliwa Radioelectronic Reconnaissance Regiment ″Admiral Arendt Dickman″ (6.ORel)
  - Military Unit NIL "Brigadier General August Emil Fieldorf «Nil»" (JW NIL)
  - Narodowe Centrum Bezpieczeństwa Cyberprzestrzeni (NCBC) - National Centre for Cyberspace Security) (SIGINT, cyberwarfare and cryptology)

== See also ==
- History of Polish intelligence services
