= Rudolf Schmidt =

Nazi German general

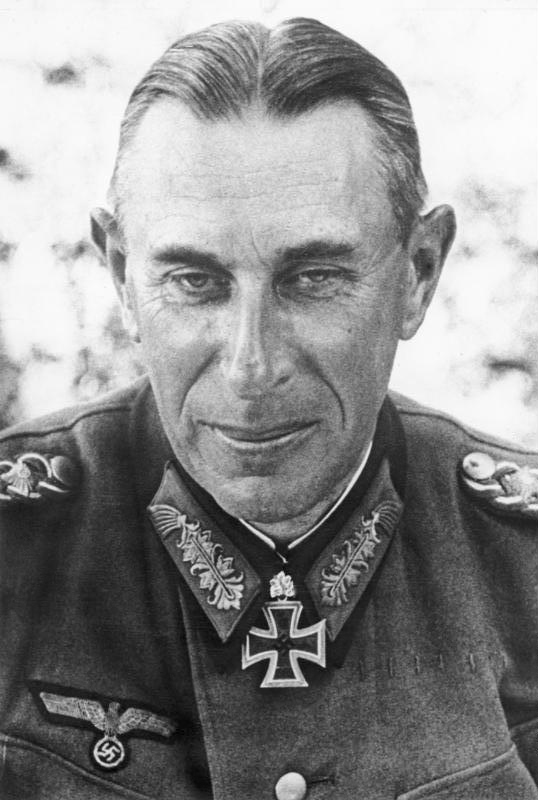
- Schmidt in 1942
- Born: 12 May 1886; Berlin, Kingdom of Prussia, German Empire
- Died: 7 April 1957 (aged 70); Krefeld, North Rhine-Westphalia, West Germany
- Relatives: ∞ 1 June 1917 Fridel Leitholf; Hans-Thilo Schmidt (brother)
- Military career
- Allegiance: German Empire; Weimar Republic; Nazi Germany
- Branch: Prussian Army; Imperial German Army; Reichsheer; German Army
- Service years: 1906–1943
- Rank: Generaloberst
- Commands: 1st Panzer Division; XXXIX Panzer Corps; 2nd Panzer Army
- Conflicts: World War I; World War II; Defence against the Kozelsk Offensive
- Awards: Knight's Cross of the Iron Cross with Oak Leaves

Rudolf Friedrich Carl Schmidt (12 May 1886 – 7 April 1957) was a general in the Wehrmacht of Nazi Germany during World War II who commanded the 2nd Panzer Army on the Eastern Front. He was a recipient of the Knight's Cross of the Iron Cross with Oak Leaves. He was the older brother of Hans-Thilo Schmidt, who sold secrets about the Enigma machine to the French.

== Career ==
Schmidt joined the Prussian Army in 1906 and served during World War I. He was retained in the Reichswehr where he served in staff roles. In October 1936 he was promoted to Generalmajor and appointed commander of the 1st Panzer Division. In 1939 Schmidt led the division in the invasion of Poland.

On 1 February 1940 he was appointed commanding general of the XXXIX Panzer Corps. He led the Corps in France and was awarded the Knight's Cross of the Iron Cross for his role in that campaign on 3 June 1940. He was promoted to General der Panzertruppe and appointed acting commander of the 2nd Army which took part in the Battle of Moscow. On 25 December 1941 he was appointed Commander of the 2nd Panzer Army (replacing the sacked General Guderian).

His brother Hans-Thilo Schmidt sold details of the Germans' Enigma machine and other sensitive military information to the French Deuxième Bureau from 1931 until the German invasion of France in 1940. On 16 March with effect and rank seniority (RDA) from 1 January 1942 (order number 2), Schmidt was promoted to Generaloberst, but on 10 April 1943, he was relieved of his command after the Gestapo arrested his brother for spying for the French, and found letters that Schmidt had written in which he was highly critical of Hitler’s conduct of the war and the Nazi Party. He appeared before a court martial but was acquitted.

According to the order of the Deputy General Command IX Army Corps, Schmidt was discharged from active service with the statutory pension on 6 October with effect from 30 September 1943 (he received transitional allowance and, from 1 January 1944, a pension). Generaloberst (Ret.) Schmidt was never re-activated.

=== POW ===
On 16 December 1947 Schmidt was arrested by Soviet soldiers on his way to his home in Weimar. Taken to Moscow, he was initially imprisoned at the Vladimir Central Prison and Butyrka prison. In 1952, he was sentenced to 25 years in prison for war crimes by a military tribunal. In September 1955, West Germany Chancellor Adenauer visited Moscow and negotiated with Nikita Khrushchev. On 12 September 1955, he reached an agreement on the return of 10,000 of indicted war criminals and the establishment of diplomatic relations. On 7 January 1956, Schmidt was released and repatriated to West Germany.

== Promotions ==
- 25 September 1906 Fahnenjunker (Officer Candidate)
- 18 May 1907 Fähnrich (Officer Cadet)
- 27 January 1908 Leutnant (2nd Lieutenant) with Patent from 22 July 1906
- 28 November 1914 Oberleutnant (1st Lieutenant)
- 18 December 1915 Hauptmann (Captain)
  - 1 July 1922 received Reichswehr Rank Seniority (RDA) from 18 December 1915 (33)
- 1 February 1927 Major (17)
- 1 April 1931 Oberstleutnant (Lieutenant Colonel)
- 1 October 1933 Oberst (Colonel)
- 1 October 1936 Generalmajor (Brigadier General)
- 1 June 1938 Generalleutnant (Major General)
- 1 June 1940 General der Panzertruppe (Lieutenant General) (8)
- 16 March 1942 Generaloberst (General) with effect and RDA from 1 January 1942 (2)

== Awards and decorations (excerpt) ==
- Brunswick House Order of Henry the Lion, 4th Class (BrH4)
- Iron Cross (1914), 2nd and 1st Class
- Baden Order of the Zähringer Lion, Knight's Cross II. Class with Oak Leaves and Swords (BZL3bXmE/BZ3bXmE)
- Military Merit Cross (Austria-Hungary), 3rd Class with War Decoration (ÖM3K)
- Gallipoli Star (TH)
- Order of Military Merit (Bulgaria), Officer (IV. Grade; BMO4/BO4)
- Honour Cross of the World War 1914/1918 with Swords on 31 October 1934
- Wehrmacht Long Service Award, 4th to 1st Class (25-year Service Cross)
- Sudetenland Medal
- Repetition Clasp 1939 to the Iron Cross 1914, 2nd and 1st Class
  - 2nd Class on 22 September 1939
  - 1st Class on 2 October 1939
- Panzer Badge in Silver 15 February 1942
- Knight's Cross of the Iron Cross with Oak Leaves
  - Knight's Cross on 3 June 1940 as Generalleutnant and Commanding General of the XXXIX. Armeekorps (mot.)
  - 19th Oak Leaves on 10 July 1941 as General der Panzertruppe and Commanding General of the XXXIX. Armeekorps (mot.)

Military offices
Preceded by —	Commander of XXXIX. Panzerkorps; 1 February 1940 – 10 November 1941	Succeeded by Generaloberst Hans-Jürgen von Arnim
Preceded by Generaloberst Heinz Guderian	Commander of 2. Panzerarmee; 25 December 1941 – 10 April 1943	Succeeded by General der Infanterie Heinrich Clößner
