= F. W. Winterbotham =

British military officer and author (1897–1990)

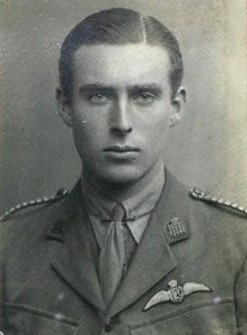
- F.W. Winterbotham in Royal Flying Corps uniform
- Born: Frederick William Winterbotham; 16 April 1897; Stroud, Gloucestershire, England
- Died: 28 January 1990 (aged 92); Blandford, Dorset, England
- Military career
- Allegiance: United Kingdom
- Branch: British Army; Royal Air Force
- Service years: 1914–1918, 1939–1946
- Rank: Group Captain
- Conflicts: World War I World War II
- Awards: Commander of the British Empire (CBE)
- Other work: author

Frederick William Winterbotham CBE (16 April 1897 – 28 January 1990) was a British Royal Air Force officer (latterly a Group Captain) who during World War II supervised the distribution of Ultra intelligence. His book The Ultra Secret was the first popular account of Ultra to be published in Britain.

== Family and education ==
He was born in Stroud, Gloucestershire, the younger child and only son of Frederick Winterbotham, solicitor, and his wife, Florence Vernon Graham. He was educated at Charterhouse School, in Godalming, Surrey. He married four times: Erica Horniman (1921), daughter of Frederick John Horniman, tea trader and MP, Madge Mary Moncrieff Anderson (1939), Joan Petrea Trant (1948) and Kathleen Price (1987). He had at least one daughter, with Joan.

== World War I service ==
At the start of the Great War, in August 1914, Winterbotham enlisted in the Royal Gloucestershire Hussars, but in 1916 they lost their horses and were to be supplied with bicycles or transferred to infantry, so he transferred to the Royal Flying Corps in 1916, and became a fighter pilot. He was shot down and captured on 13 July 1917, after a dogfight in the Passendale area by a member of the Luftstreitkräfte squadron known as Jagdstaffel 11 which produced many high-scoring "aces". He spent the rest of the war as a prisoner, and "passed the time" learning German. For much of the time he was in the Holzminden prisoner-of-war camp.

== Between the wars ==
Upon his release in 1918 he went to Christ Church, Oxford, to study law. He took a law degree (1920) in the shortened course for returning servicemen, but had no liking for an office job. He pursued farming opportunities in Britain, Kenya, and Rhodesia without success. By 1929 he was back in Britain, and considered becoming a stockbroker in the City. Instead he was recruited to join the staff of the Royal Air Force, where he was assigned to the newly created Air Section of the Secret Intelligence Service (MI6). During the next few years, Winterbotham began the process of building up an intelligence service for the RAF. His job was to gather information on the development of military aviation in hostile or potentially hostile countries. He recruited agents, and filed and analyzed their reports.

One of these reports revealed that Germany had secret arrangements with the Soviet Union for the training of military pilots in violation of the Treaty of Versailles. William de Ropp, the agent who supplied this information, also informed Winterbotham that the Nazis, not yet in power, wanted to cultivate high-level contacts in Britain; they imagined that "imperialist" Britain would be sympathetic to their own dreams of racial conquest. Winterbotham, who was socially well connected, seemed a likely channel.

This led to a visit by Nazi "philosopher" Alfred Rosenberg in 1932. Winterbotham, with the full knowledge of MI6, escorted Rosenberg around Britain, made some appropriate introductions, and played up to him. Neither Ropp nor Rosenberg knew that Winterbotham had any intelligence connections—he was just a civilian official of the Air Staff.

Winterbotham continued in this role for the next seven years. He became a regular visitor to Germany, and an apparent Nazi sympathizer. As such, he was welcomed into the highest circles in Germany, meeting Hitler and Göring, and with Göring's Luftwaffe subordinates such as Erhard Milch and Albert von Kesselring. He gathered a tremendous amount of information on the Luftwaffe and on German political and military intentions.

He may also have been involved in an observer mission with General Franco's fascist forces in the Spanish Civil War. A report written by a William Winterbottom, dated 16 February 1937, filed in AIR 40/224, provides highly technical analysis of events that reflected his professional military experience. It was read by a member of the Air Intelligence Staff on 26 September 1937.

In 1938, Winterbotham recruited Sidney Cotton to carry out some very successful aerial reconnaissance over Italy and Germany in 1939–40 in a private Lockheed 12A aircraft.

== Ultra ==
These activities came to an end when World War II broke out in 1939. As a top ranking member of MI6 (he reported directly to its head, Sir Hugh Sinclair, and his successor in 1940, Sir Stewart Menzies), Winterbotham was fully aware of Britain's successful code-breaking operation against the German Enigma cipher machine. The intelligence derived from Enigma decrypts was absolutely authentic (as the decrypted messages were genuine German communications) and it was often of immense value. This source was so valuable it was given the special classification "Top Secret Ultra", or simply "Ultra".

In April 1940 the cryptographers at Bletchley Park made a breakthrough when they succeeded in deciphering four small messages regarding Luftwaffe personnel. This led Winterbotham to consider how the information from this would be handled once it became more plentiful, and he shared his ideas on this topic with his Chief. His chief gave him "permission to set up a completely new organisation for the translation, distribution and complete security of the decoded signals...". A key part of the solution was arranging for the secure delivery of Ultra to the various commanders, and making sure that they did nothing to give away the secret that Enigma was being read. Winterbotham took charge of this process. He formed Special Liaison Units, which were attached to each field headquarters that received Enigma. An SLU consisted of a few RAF officers and enlisted men, low in rank to avoid drawing attention. They received Ultra messages by radio from Britain, carefully encrypted in Britain's strongest cipher. They decrypted the messages, and handed them over to the commander, who was often the only person cleared to know where the information came from. (At some HQs, there might be one or two deputies also cleared.) The SLU was expected to retrieve the Ultra message after the commander had read it and keep it under lock and key.

The SLU was also expected to keep the recipient commander from telling anyone else about the origins of the message or acting too obviously on its contents. Naturally, this sometimes led to conflicts with field commanders who objected to being second-guessed. After the U.S. entered the war, these field commanders were often not British. Winterbotham was responsible for recruiting and training the SLU personnel for this difficult role. They had to be very able technically, be close-mouthed, keep a low profile, and also be diplomatic enough to manage commanders who far outranked them. When diplomacy failed, Winterbotham flew out to the problem HQ to resolve the quarrel. He had the ultimate authority of the Allied governments behind him, as both Britain and the U.S. would do almost anything to avoid exposing the secret of the decryptions.

== The Ultra Secret ==
Ultra remained secret even after the war. Then in 1974, Winterbotham's book, The Ultra Secret, was published. This was the first book in English about Ultra, and it explained what Ultra was, and revealed Winterbotham's role, particularly with regard to the dissemination and use of Ultra.

There had been mentions of Enigma decryption in earlier books by Władysław Kozaczuk, Ladislas Farago and Gustave Bertrand. However, Winterbotham's book was the first extensive account of the uses to which the massive volumes of Enigma-derived intelligence were put by the Allies, on the western and eastern European fronts, in the Mediterranean, North Africa, and perhaps most crucially, in the Battle of the Atlantic.

Winterbotham's account has been criticised for inaccuracies and self-aggrandizement. Winterbotham acknowledged in the book that he was no cryptologist, had only slight understanding of the cryptologic side of the multi-faceted and strictly compartmentalised Ultra operation, and had no access to official records so was written from memory. His description of the pioneering work done by Poland's Cipher Bureau before the war is minimal. Winterbotham later responded that he had simply passed on the story that he had been given at the time. He erroneously suggested that Japan's PURPLE cipher machine was a version of the German Enigma and confused "Dilly" Knox with a different person.

== The Coventry Controversy ==
During The Blitz of 1940–1941, Coventry was severely bombed by the Luftwaffe on the night of 14–15 November. There was heavy damage and numerous civilian casualties. Winterbotham asserted that Enigma decrypts had provided clear advance warning of the raid but that Churchill personally decided not to take any special countermeasures that might alert the Germans that the British were reading Enigma. William Stevenson conformed this in a book about Sir William Stephenson which Stephenson had read and authenticated. Reginald Victor Jones said that "to my knowledge this is not what happened" while, Peter Calvocoressi wrote that "Ultra never mentioned Coventry... Churchill, so far from pondering whether to save Coventry or safeguard Ultra, was under the impression that the raid was to be on London." Ralph Bennett, however, asserted that Ultra had revealed that somewhere in the Midlands was going to be bombed but that by the time Churchill realised it was Coventry, it was too late for him to be realistically capable of doing anything even if the matter were discussed. Sir Francis Harry Hinsley, on the other hand, wrote that the Ultra codebreakers knew that the town to be bombed would be either Coventry or Birmingham.

Winterbotham concluded that the war's outcome "was, in fact, a very narrow shave, and the reader may like to ponder [...] whether or not we might have won had we not had Ultra".

== Role in enabling the "Dambusters" raid ==
James Holland credits Winterbotham with responding to a letter from Barnes Wallis with a desperate cry for assistance ("help oh help") with a letter of his own, in February 1943. Winterbotham's letter ensured the chief of the air staff, Air Chief Marshal Sir Charles Portal, knew of the Wallis plan, and took a favourable view of it. Portal overrode the resistance of Sir Arthur Harris, head of Bomber Command, to Wallis' proposal, and the Dambusters raid, code-named Operation Chastise in May 1943, was approved.

== Publications ==
Before and after The Ultra Secret, Winterbotham wrote several other books dealing with various aspects of his intelligence work.

- Winterbotham, Frederick. Secret and Personal. London, 1969.
- Winterbotham, Frederick. The Ultra Secret. London: Weidenfeld and Nicolson, 1974. ISBN 0-297-76832-8. Also London: Futura, 1975, ISBN 0-86007-268-1.
- Winterbotham, Frederick. The Nazi Connection. London: Weidenfeld and Nicolson, 1978. ISBN 0-297-77458-1.
- Winterbotham, Frederick. The Ultra Spy: An Autobiography. London: Macmillan, 1989. ISBN 0-333-51425-4.

== General and cited references ==
- Winterbotham, Frederick (1974). The Ultra Secret. London: Weidenfeld and Nicolson. ISBN 0-297-76832-8.
