= SWII =

SWII may refer to:

- Ipiranga Airport (IATA airport code: IPG; ICAO airport code: SWII) Santo Antônio do Içá, Brazil
- Secret Wars II (adventure), 1986 role playing game from TSR based on Marvel Comics
- Star Wars: Episode II – Attack of the Clones (2002 film)

== See also ==
- SW2 (disambiguation)
