= SW =

SW, sw or s/w may stand for:

== Companies ==
- Air Namibia, IATA airline code
- Sherwin-Williams, an American paint company
- Sierra Wireless, TSX
- Silk Way Airlines, an Azerbaijani private cargo airline
- Slimming World, a weight loss company
- Smith & Wesson, a firearms manufacturer
- Southern Winds Airlines, a defunct Argentine airline
- Southwestern Company, a publishing company designed for college students
- Stacy Witbeck, American construction company

== Geography ==
- Southwest, one of the four intercardinal directions
- Sweden (FIPS country code SW)
- SW postcode area, southwest London, England
- Schweinfurt, Bavaria, Germany, vehicle registration code
- Swietochlowice, Silesian Voivodeship, Poland, vehicle registration code

== Occupations ==
- Steelworker (US Navy), an occupational rating
- Enlisted Surface Warfare Specialist, a US Navy occupational rating
- Sex worker

== Science and technology ==
=== Computing and telecommunications ===
- Shortwave radio band, 1.6–30 MHz
- Shortwave radiation, in visible and near visible bands
- Smith–Waterman algorithm, algorithm for performing local sequence alignment
- sw, Store Word, an RISC-V instruction

=== Other uses in science and technology ===
- Sport wagon or crossover, an automobile configuration
- Station wagon, a designation of some manufacturers
- Olof Swartz, botanist, abbreviated Sw. in botanical citations
- Band 3, a protein
- Unified Soil Classification System symbol for well graded sand

== Other uses ==
- Sw., taxonomic author abbreviation for Olof Swartz (1760–1818), Swedish botanist and taxonomist
- Swahili language (ISO 639 alpha-2 code "sw")
- Star Wars, a science fiction media franchise
- "S.W", a song by Blonde Redhead from their 2007 album 23
- Social work
- Sawah Besar railway station, a railway station in Jakarta, Indonesia
