= Jan Kowalewski =

Polish cryptologist and engineer

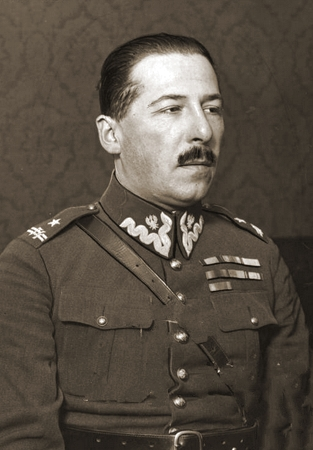
Jan Kowalewski

Lt. Col. Jan Kowalewski (23 October 1892 – 31 October 1965) was a Polish cryptologist, intelligence officer, engineer, journalist, military commander, and creator and first head of the Polish Cipher Bureau. He recruited a large staff of cryptologists who broke Soviet military codes and ciphers during the Polish-Soviet War, enabling Poland to weather the war and achieve victory in the 1920 Battle of Warsaw.

== Early life ==
Jan Kowalewski was born 1892 in Łódź, Congress Poland, under rule of the Russian Empire. After graduating from a local trade school, between 1909 and 1913 he studied at the University of Liège in Belgium, where he graduated from the faculty of chemistry.

== World War I ==
He returned to Poland in 1913, only to be mobilized for the Russian Army the following year, at the outbreak of World War I. He fought in various formations on the Belarusian and Romanian fronts as an officer of the Engineering and Signal Corps, and in December 1918 he was allowed to join the Polish unit formed under command of Gen. Lucjan Żeligowski out of Poles living in Russia. As chief of intelligence of the Polish 4th Rifle Division he crossed the Romanian border with the Division and reached Poland in May 1919.

== Polish-Soviet War ==
A polyglot and amateur cryptologist, Kowalewski was initially attached to the staff of Gen. Józef Haller, fighting in Volhynia and Eastern Lesser Poland during the Polish-Ukrainian War for the city of Lwów. One day during his service there, Kowalewski was given some enciphered Bolshevik messages that had been intercepted, and within two days, he had deciphered them. They revealed the Bolsheviks' appreciation of General Anton Denikin's White Russian forces. He also managed to break the codes and ciphers of the army of the West Ukrainian People's Republic. He had to spend all night segregating radio intercepts and discarding the encrypted ones, it caused a major sensation among the staff.

As a result, in July 1919 he was transferred to Warsaw, where he became chief of the Polish General Staff's radio-intelligence department. By early September he had gathered a group of mathematicians from Warsaw University and Lwów University (most notably, founders of the Polish School of Mathematics—Stanisław Leśniewski, Stefan Mazurkiewicz and Wacław Sierpiński), who were also able to break Russian ciphers. Though Kowalewski's contribution to Polish victory in the Polish-Soviet War remained a secret for over 70 years, he was awarded Poland's highest military decoration, the Silver Cross of the Virtuti Militari.

== Interbellum ==
After the war ended, he was attached to the staff of the Third Silesian Uprising as the commander of intelligence services. In 1923 he was sent to Tokyo, where he organized a course in radio intelligence for Japanese officers. For his efforts in this area he was awarded the Order of the Rising Sun - the highest military award in Japan. In 1928 he graduated from the École Supérieure de Guerre in Paris and was promoted to the rank of major. Although not directly involved in radio intelligence any more, he remained a Polish intelligence officer. From 1929 he served as a military attaché at the Polish embassy in Moscow, but in 1933 he was declared persona non grata and moved to a similar post in the embassy in Bucharest, where he remained until 1937. Upon his return to Poland he briefly headed one of the branches of the Obóz Zjednoczenia Narodowego political organization and became the director of TISSA company, a Polish intelligence-sponsored company importing rare materials for the Polish arms industry. He was also promoted to lieutenant colonel.

== World War II ==
After the outbreak of the Polish Defensive War of 1939 he was evacuated to Romania, where he headed a committee of relief for Polish war refugees. In January 1940 he moved to France, where he joined the Polish Army in exile and became a proponent of an Allied offensive in the Balkans. However, the German spring offensive and the fall of France made the plan moot and Kowalewski had to flee German-occupied France. Through Vichy France and Spain he reached Portugal, where he formed yet another committee of relief for war refugees. Initially based at Figueira da Foz, he soon moved to Lisbon, then a center of espionage and battleground for spies of all countries involved in World War II. There he made contact with his friend Jean Pangal (Ioan Pangal), a Romanian centrist politician and former Romanian envoy to Lisbon. Though dismissed by the end of 1941 by Romanian leader Ion Antonescu for his pro-Allied stance, Pangal remained in Lisbon and became a collaborator of Polish intelligence in Allied attempts to win over the Third Reich's allies - Hungary, Romania, Finland and Italy.

=== Lisbon, 1941 ===
The collaboration with Pangal proved vital to the Polish and Allied war effort, and Kowalewski managed to convince Gen. Władysław Sikorski and Minister Stanisław Kot to create a center of Polish intelligence in Lisbon on January 15, 1941. Officially named the Center for Contact with the Continent (Placówka Łączności z Kontynentem), the Lisbon-based bureau was headed by Kowalewski and soon became the hub of an extensive net of Polish resistance, sabotage and intelligence organizations throughout occupied Europe.

Acting independently of similar groups in Poland, which were run directly from London or Warsaw, the center coordinated the efforts of dozens of groups in France, Belgium, the Netherlands, Greece, Italy, North Africa, Spain and even Germany. It organized communication between the Polish Government in Exile and occupied Europe, as well as providing logistical and financial support for Polish resistance groups throughout Western Europe.

Kowalewski's intelligence network was also helpful to the British government, as most of his reports were passed either to SOE or to the Ministry of Economic Warfare. A notable coup for his Lisbon center was the passing of the exact date for Operation Barbarossa to the British, who were thus informed of the fact at least two weeks prior to the actual invasion of Russia.

Kowalewski also managed to neutralize a secret radio station used by the Germans to communicate with U-boats operating in the Atlantic. He was also crucial in enabling former Romanian King Carol II to escape from Romania, and leave Spain for Lisbon.

== Postwar ==
Despite Kowalewski having contacts with numerous politicians of Hungary, Romania and Italy willing to change sides, the situation changed after the Casablanca Conference of 1943, when the Allies demanded the unconditional surrender of the Axis. The situation further deteriorated after the Tehran Conference, when it became clear that Hungary and Romania would fall under Soviet domination anyway and that the plan for a second front in the Balkans, which would allow the Hungarians and Romanians to break with Nazi Germany was finally dismissed. According to recent research by a Polish-British joint history commission for investigation of Polish World War II intelligence service, at the latter conference the Soviets demanded that Kowalewski be withdrawn from his post to England.

In late January 1944 Frank Roberts, head of the Central Department of the British Foreign Office, informed Gen. Colin Gubbins, head of the SOE, that Kowalewski's network was not only aimed at the Germans, but at creating a common Polish-Hungarian-Romanian Bloc, which was allegedly aimed at vital Soviet interests.

On 6 March 1944 Sir Alexander Cadogan of the Foreign Office informed the Polish minister of foreign affairs Edward Raczyński that Kowalewski's contacts with the opposing powers could be treated as treachery and that he should be dismissed. Although no proofs were presented, the Polish government felt forced to obey the British wish and Kowalewski was dismissed from his post on 20 March and on 5 April he was transported to London.

Kowalewski was named the chief of the Polish Operations Bureau at the Special Forces Headquarters. Among his tasks was the preparation of the Polish resistance organizations in occupied Europe for Operation Overlord. However, his post was mostly titular as it was already too late for any arrangements to have effect and Kowalewski could change nothing.

== British exile ==
After the war Kowalewski remained in exile in Great Britain, where he started working as a journalist. Until 1955 he was the editor in chief of an East Europe and Soviet Russia monthly. In 1958 and 1959 he was also a tutor at an unofficial military school for the Polish diaspora. He also briefly collaborated with Radio Free Europe and other Polish exile organizations. In his late years, in 1963, he briefly returned to cryptanalysis and managed to break the codes used by Romuald Traugutt during the January Uprising. He died of cancer on 31 October 1965 in London.

== See also ==
- History of Polish Intelligence Services
- List of Poles
- Western betrayal
