= Władysław Kozaczuk =

Historian, Officer of Polish Army

Władysław Kozaczuk (23 December 1923 – 26 September 2003) was a Polish Army colonel and a military and intelligence historian.

== Life ==
Born in the village of Babiki near Sokółka, Kozaczuk joined the army in 1944, during World War II, at Białystok. In 1945 he became a Polish Army second lieutenant, and spent the first five years of his service commanding operational units of the Internal Security Corps, fighting the Polish anticommunist underground and then the Ukrainian Insurgent Army. In 1950 he was transferred to the Internal Security Corps Staff in Warsaw.

In 1954–55, following the Korean War, Kozaczuk carried out armistice-related duties in Korea. In 1955–58 he served in the Polish Ministry of Internal Affairs (Ministerstwo Spraw Wewnętrznych). In 1957–58 he saw duty with the International Control Commission in Vietnam.

In 1958–69 he served in Polish military counter-intelligence (Wojskowa Służba Wewnętrzna). According to his family, he found conditions there uncongenial and requested transfer to the Military Historical Institute (Wojskowy Instytut Historyczny) in Warsaw.

Kozaczuk had earned a degree in Polish philology in 1956 at Warsaw University. In 1978 he received a doctorate in history at Poland's Military Political Academy (Wojskowa Akademia Polityczna).

As a historian, Kozaczuk indignantly refuted Cold-War-inspired allegations in the anticommunist Paris-based Polish-language periodical Kultura that his books were actually works of collective authorship that were merely published under his name.

Kozaczuk was the first to reveal (in his book, Bitwa o tajemnice, Battle for Secrets, 1967) that the German Enigma-machine cipher had been broken before World War II by Polish cryptologists. After France's Gustave Bertrand gave further details of pre-war and wartime Franco-Polish collaboration on Enigma, and after the cipher's momentous wartime breaking achieved worldwide notoriety with F.W. Winterbotham's The Ultra Secret, Kozaczuk participated in international conferences devoted to World War II military intelligence and Enigma decryption. After the publication of his 1984 English-language book, Enigma, he visited the United States on a publicity tour.

In his later years, Kozaczuk devoted much attention to setting up and operating a publishing firm in Warsaw. In the course of these activities, he was set upon, robbed and beaten; thereafter, according to his family, he was never again quite the same. Aside from his history books and articles, Kozaczuk published some poems. Kozaczuk was decorated with the Knight's Cross of the Order of Polonia Restituta. He died in Warsaw, Poland, three months short of age 80, on 26 September 2003. He had been pre-deceased by his wife, a retired teacher, and left a daughter and stepdaughter.

== Works ==
Kozaczuk published a dozen books, several of them in multiple editions. They dealt chiefly with World War II, Nazi Germany and intelligence.

He is perhaps best known outside Poland for the 1984 English-language book, Enigma: How the German Machine Cipher Was Broken, and How It Was Read by the Allies in World War Two, edited and translated by Christopher Kasparek. The volume incorporates much additional documentation, most notably appendices by Marian Rejewski, beyond what had appeared in the Polish-language W kręgu Enigmy (1979). The 1984 Enigma has been described as "the Bible" on the Polish aspects of the history of Enigma-cipher decryption. It was reviewed by Stuart Milner-Barry in 1986.

The 1984 Enigma should not be confused with the slighter volume published twenty years later: Władysław Kozaczuk and Jerzy Straszak, Enigma: How the Poles Broke the Nazi Code. That 2004 Enigma is an abridgment of the 1984 book, with Marian Rejewski's appendices replaced with contributions by other authors, of uneven quality and little importance. The 2004 book presents some photos apparently not published previously; in an evidently-prewar photo Henryk Zygalski, standing beside his sister Monika (misspelled "Monica"), is misidentifed as "Maksymilian Ciężki."

== See also ==
- List of Poles
- Cipher Bureau (Poland)
