= Stefan Mayer =

Polish military intelligence officer (1895–1981)

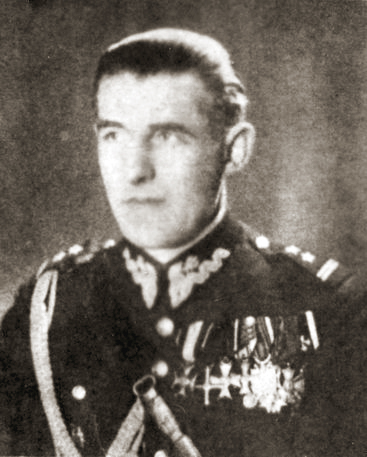
Stefan Mayer

Colonel Stefan A. Mayer (1895 — 23 March 1981, London) was a Polish military intelligence officer and prewar chief of Counterintelligence within the Polish General Staff's Section II (Oddział II). In that capacity, he supervised the General Staff's Cipher Bureau, whose achievements included the breaking of German Enigma-machine ciphers.

== Career ==
In January 1938 Mayer — cryptologist Marian Rejewski was to recall — "directed that statistics be compiled for a two-week [test] period, comparing the [quantities of Enigma-message] material solved, with the [quantities of] Enigma-enciphered material intercepted by the radiotelegraphers. The ratio came to 75 percent.... With slightly augmented personnel, we might have attained about 90 percent..."

Mayer would recall in 1974 that, before World War II, Colonel Tadeusz Pełczyński, chief of the Polish General Staff's Section II, suggested to the chief of the General Staff, General Wacław Stachiewicz, that in case of impending war the secret of Enigma decryption "be used as our Polish contribution to the common... defence and divulged to our future allies." In early January 1939, when Pełczyński was replaced as chief of Section II by Colonel Józef Smoleński, Pełczyński repeated the suggestion to Smoleński. That, writes Mayer, was the basis of Lt. Col. Gwido Langer's instructions when he represented the Polish side at the trilateral Polish-French-British cryptological conferences at Paris in January 1939 and at Warsaw in July 1939.

Mayer participated in the 26 July 1939 Warsaw conference, at which the Cipher Bureau disclosed its achievements in Enigma decryption to French and British intelligence representatives.

During the ensuing war, Mayer in 1941-1945 headed the Polish Government-in-Exile's Military Intelligence Officers School, at Bayswater, in London, which in early 1942 was moved to Glasgow, Scotland.

== See also ==
- History of Polish Intelligence Services
- List of Poles
