= PC Bruno =

WWII signals–intelligence stations near Paris

PC Bruno was a Polish–French–Republican Spanish signals–intelligence station near Paris during World War II, from October 1939 until June 1940. Its function was decryption of cipher messages, most notably German messages enciphered on the Enigma machine.

PC Bruno worked in close cooperation with Britain's decryption center at Bletchley Park.

== History ==
In the early 1930s, French military intelligence acquired operation manuals and sample messages for the German Enigma cipher machine. French intelligence officer Captain Gustave Bertrand supplied this material to Poland's Biuro Szyfrów ("Cipher Bureau"), which used it as part of their successful effort to break Enigma.

In July 1939 the Biuro Szyfrów gave French and British intelligence all their results. Both countries were expanding their decryption efforts in anticipation of war, and this continued after the war started in September 1939.

When Poland was overrun by Germany and the Soviet Union, the key staff of the Biuro Szyfrów were evacuated to Romania, and from there eventually reached France. On 20 October 1939 the Poles resumed work, hosted by French intelligence at PC Bruno.

PC Bruno was located in the Château de Vignolles in Gretz-Armainvilliers, some 40 kilometres southeast of Paris. It was headed by now-Major Bertrand. Its personnel included 15 Poles, 50 Frenchmen, and 7 anti-fascist Spaniards who worked on Spanish and Italian ciphers. The Polish group was led by Lt. Col. Gwido Langer and included the mathematicians who had been breaking Enigma for nearly seven years since December 1932: Marian Rejewski, Jerzy Różycki, and Henryk Zygalski. The Spanish team (Equipo D – Team D) was led by Faustino A.V. Camazón, who was aware of the use of the Enigma machine by German forces during the Spanish Civil War.

As late as 3–7 December 1939, when Lt. Col. Langer and French Air Force Capt. Henri Braquenié visited London and Bletchley Park, the British asked that the Polish cryptologists be made available to them in Britain. Langer, however, took the position that they must remain where the Polish army in exile was forming—on French soil.

Bletchley Park and PC Bruno worked together against the German message traffic. In the interest of security, they themselves corresponded using the supposedly "unbreakable" Enigma cipher. In early 1940, the two centres read some old Enigma messages, and in March they broke some German daily keys, and read some messages "in real time" (i.e., sometimes as soon as their intended German recipients). During the next few months, the two centres decrypted several thousand Enigma messages, about half at each centre. Some of the messages gave notice of the German invasion of Denmark and Norway and of the German invasions on Belgium, the Netherlands, and France. However, no effective Allied use was made of these warnings.

By June 1940, advancing German forces were approaching PC Bruno. Just after midnight on 10 June, Bertrand evacuated the Bruno staff from Gretz-Armainvillers. France surrendered on 22 June; on 24 June he flew the 15 Poles and seven Spaniards in three planes to Algeria.

In September 1940, Bertrand secretly returned them to France. He established a new decryption center at Uzès near the Mediterranean Sea coast, in the unoccupied 'Free Zone' of France. This center, codenamed Cadix, resumed breaking ciphers. Cadix operated until the German occupation of southern France in November 1942.

== See also ==
- Cadix
- Biuro Szyfrów
