= Gustave Bertrand =

French military intelligence officer

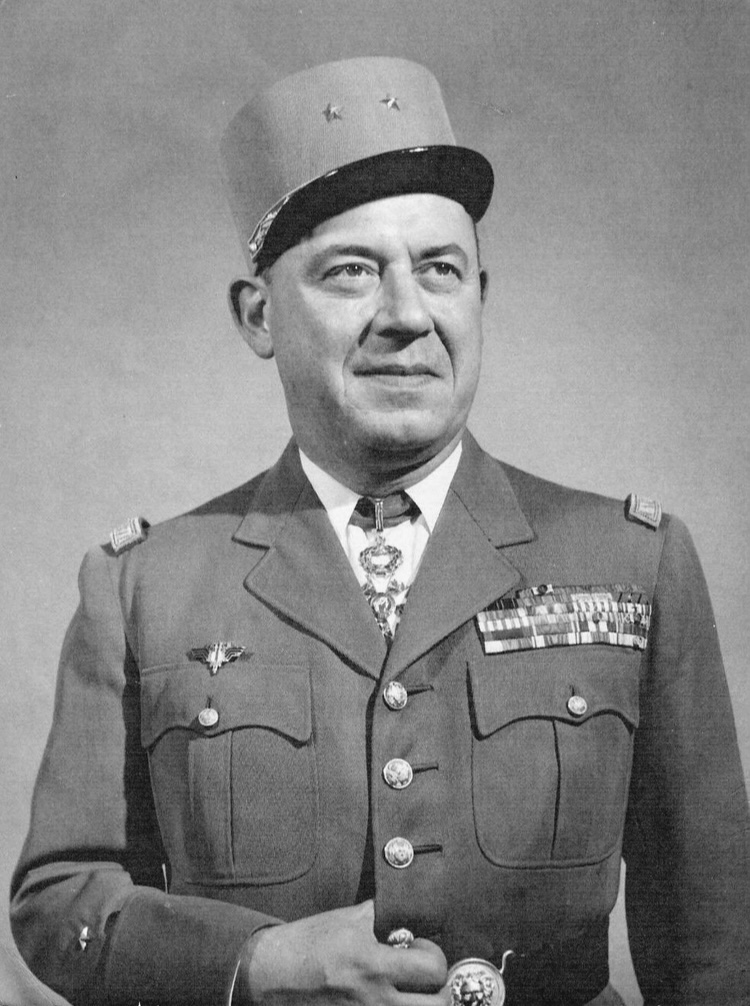
- Born: 1896
- Died: 1976 (aged 79–80)
- Occupation: Military intelligence officer

Gustave Bertrand (1896–1976) was a French military intelligence officer who made a vital contribution to the decryption, by Poland's Cipher Bureau, of German Enigma ciphers, beginning in December 1932. This achievement would in turn lead to Britain's celebrated World War II Ultra operation.

== Life ==
Bertrand joined the French military as a private in 1914 and was wounded in 1915 at the Dardanelles. From 1926, he worked in radio intelligence.

In the 1920s, French radio intelligence was decentralized. Decryption of foreign, chiefly German and Italian, ciphers and codes was the responsibility of a General Staff cryptology department, while radio monitoring was conducted by the intelligence service, Service de Renseignement or S.R. At the end of 1930, decryption was turned over to the S.R., which created a Section D (for Decryptement), of which Bertrand became chief. He later took over all of French radio intelligence.

Bertrand's intelligence associates had purchased documents pertaining to the Enigma machine from Hans-Thilo Schmidt (codenamed "Asché" by the French), an employee at the German Armed Forces' Cryptographic Agency. In December 1932, then-Captain (later, General) Bertrand turned these documents over to the Polish Cipher Bureau's chief, Major Gwido Langer. Asché's documents, according to cryptologist Marian Rejewski's testimony, proved in practice crucial to his mathematical solution of the military Enigma machine's wiring. During his work with the Poles, Bertrand used the code name Bolek, given him by the Poles.

Bertrand was to learn of the Poles' success against Enigma only six and a half years later, at a trilateral Polish-French-British conference held in the Kabaty Woods, south of Warsaw, on 25 July 1939, just five weeks before the outbreak of World War II. After Germany's invasion of Poland in September 1939, then-Major Bertrand from October 1939 to November 1942 sponsored the continued work of prewar Cipher Bureau personnel: first at PC Bruno, outside Paris; then, after Germany's invasion of France (May–June 1940), at the Cadix center in southern France's Vichy "Free Zone."

Over a year after the Cadix center had been scattered to avert capture by the Germans, on 5 January 1944, Bertrand was captured by the Germans as he waited at the famous Church of Sacré Cœur, in Paris' Montmartre district, for a courier from London. The Germans suggested that he work for them. Pretending to agree, Bertrand was allowed to return with his wife Mary to Vichy to contact British intelligence. There he sent his underground comrades into hiding and went into hiding himself. On 2 June 1944, four days before the D-Day Normandy landings, at an improvised airstrip in France's Massif Central, Bertrand, his wife and a Jesuit priest who served as a courier of the Polish Resistance climbed into a small, unarmed Lysander III aircraft that flew them to southern England. Bertrand and his wife moved into a house in the Hertfordshire village of Boxmoor just a short walk from the Polish radio-intercept station and cipher office at the nearby village of Felden where Marian Rejewski and Henryk Zygalski were working.

Bertrand retired from the French Secret Service in 1950 and went on to become mayor of Théoule-sur-Mer in southern France.

In 1973, the Paris publishing house Plon published his book, Enigma ou la plus grande énigme de la guerre 1939-1945 (Enigma, or the Greatest Enigma of the War of 1939-1945). The book, one of the principal primary sources on the history of Enigma decryption, for the first time gave a detailed account of the some eleven years of Franco-Polish collaboration in breaking and reading Enigma before and during World War II.

== See also ==
- Cryptanalysis of the Enigma
- Wilfred Dunderdale
- Ultra (cryptography)
