= Military history of Poland during World War II =

Aspect of military history

Polish contribution to World War II
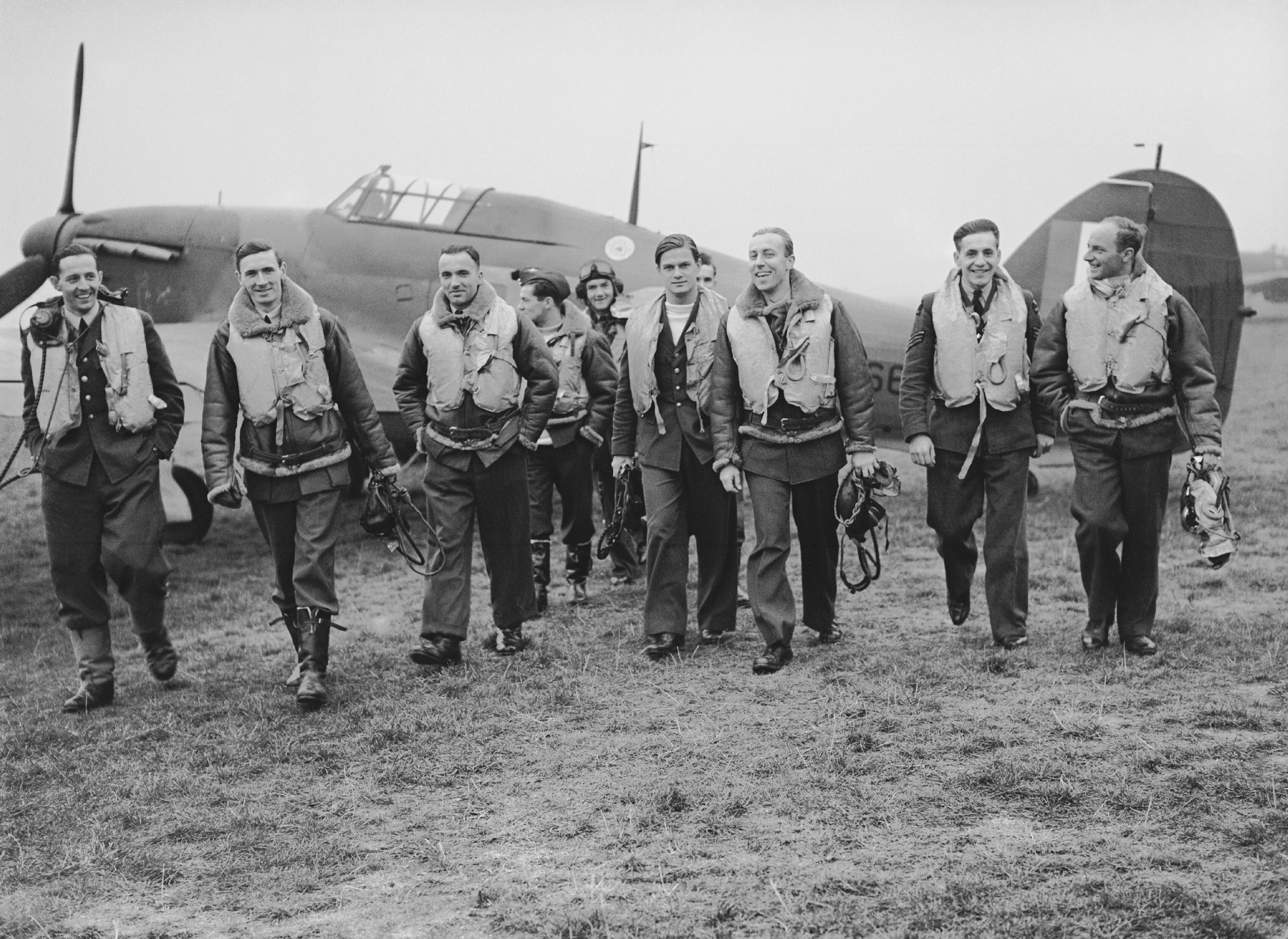
- Pilots of the No. 303 Squadron, from left: P/O Ferić, Flt Lt Kent, F/O Grzeszczak, P/O Radomski, P/O Zumbach, P/O Łokuciewski, F/O Henneberg, Sgt. Rogowski, Sgt. Szaposznikow

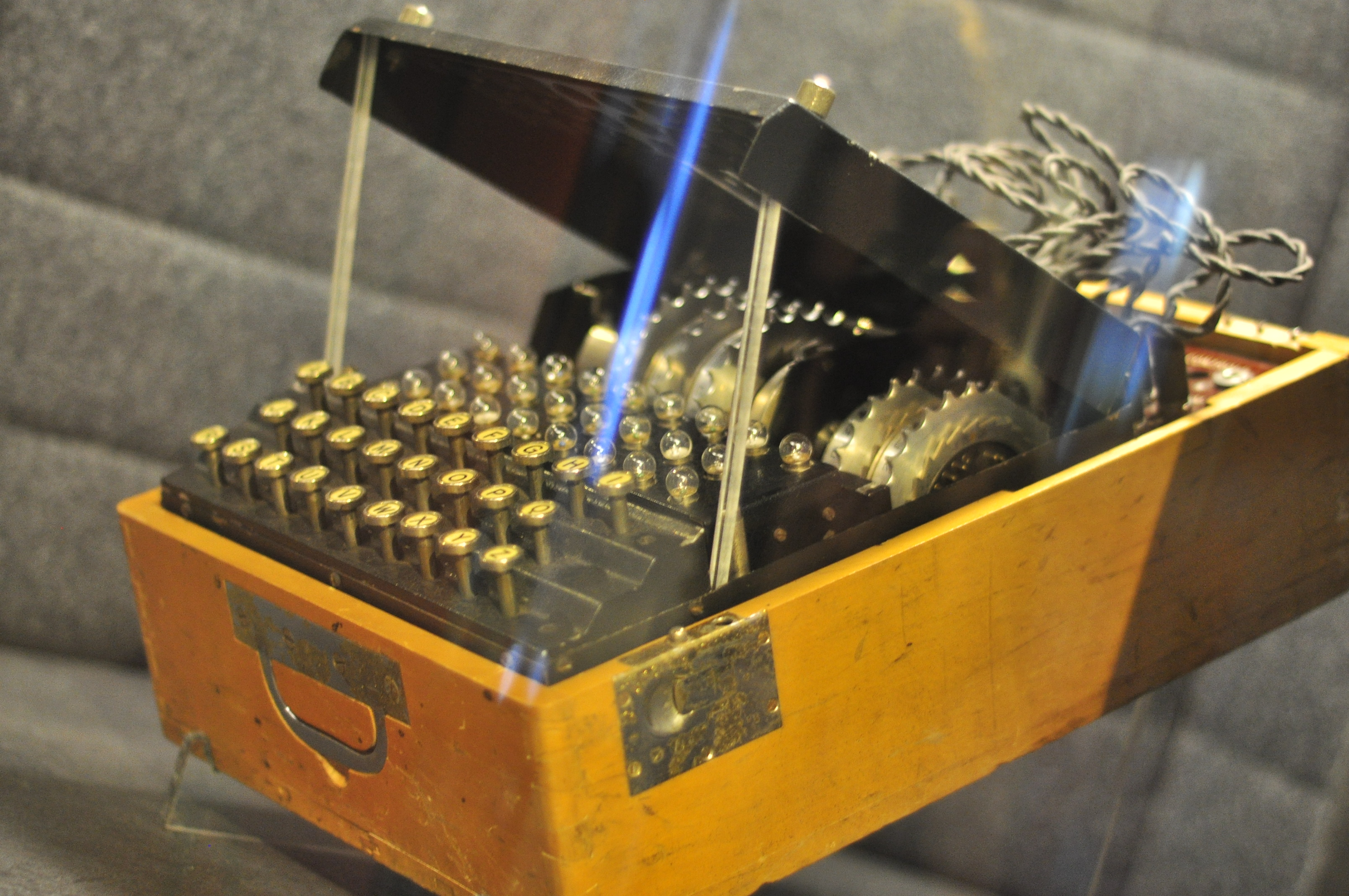
- One of the four Polish Enigma doubles assembled eight years after Poland was first to crack the German machine, in 1932

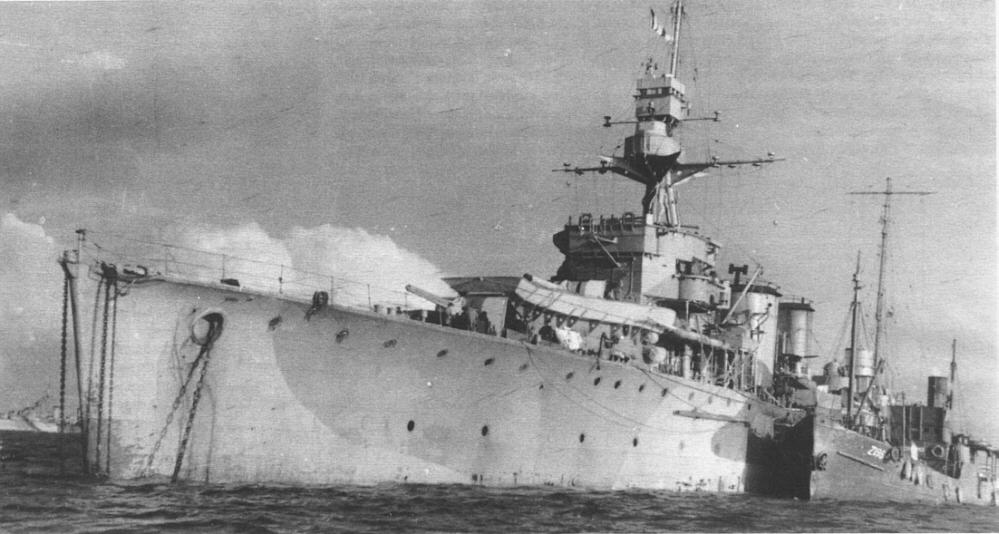
- ORP Dragon, in Polish Navy service from January 1943

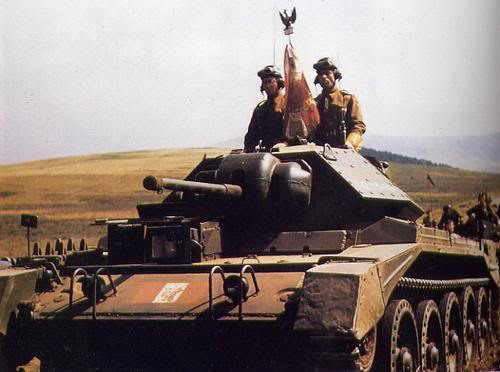
- Crusader tank of Polish 1st Armoured Division, near Haddington, 1943

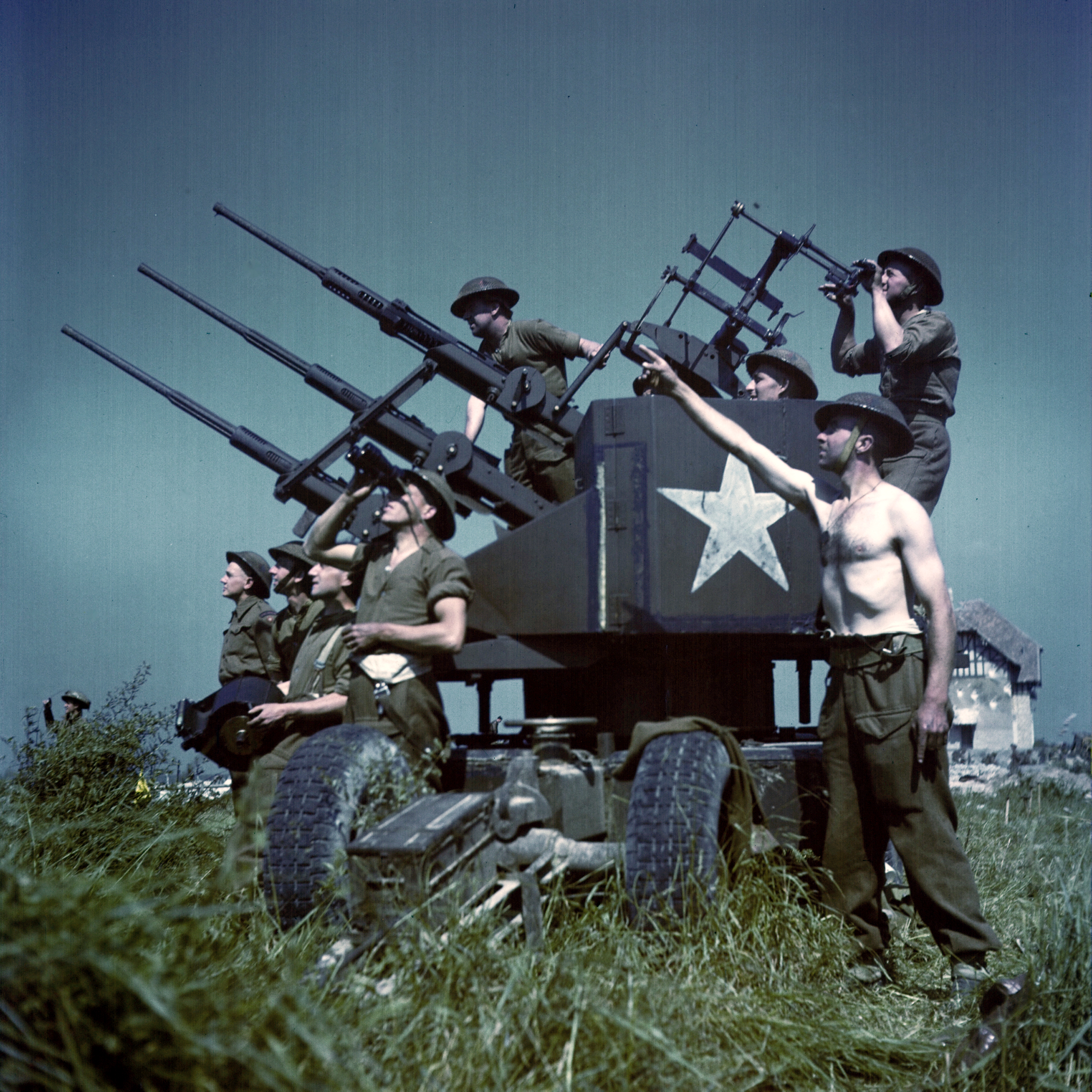
- Anti-aircraft mounting with three Polish Polsten cannons

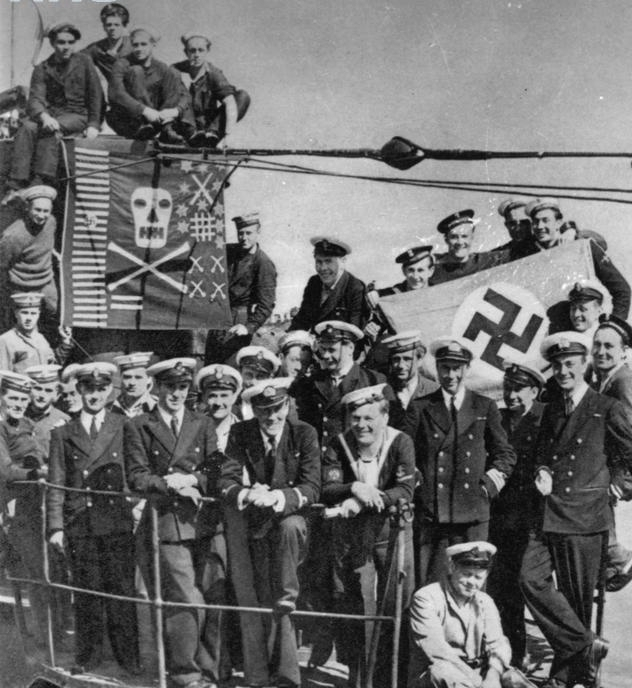
- Crew of submarine ORP Sokół with Jolly Roger marking number of sunk or damaged enemy ships

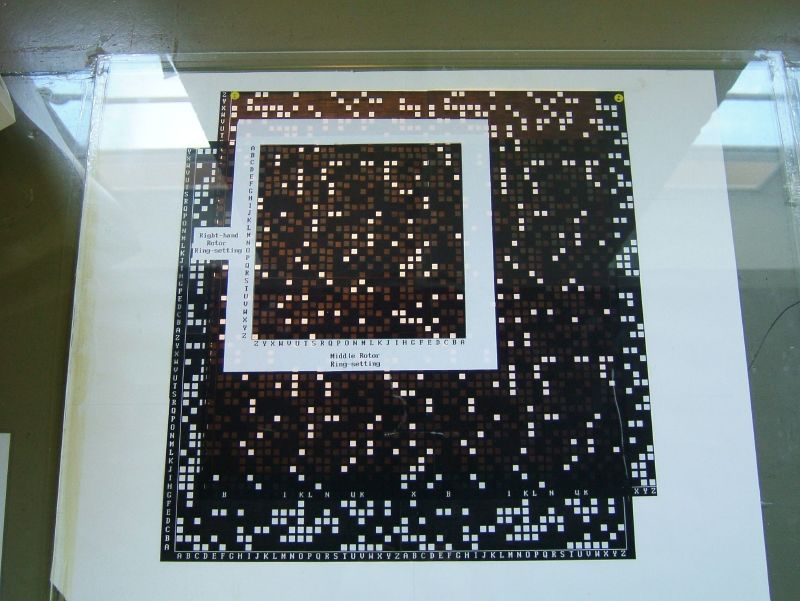
- Demonstration of Zygalski sheets (perforated sheets)

In World War II, the Polish armed forces were the fourth largest Allied forces in Europe, after those of the Soviet Union, United States and Britain.^{[a]} Poles made substantial contributions to the Allied effort throughout the war, fighting on land, sea, and in the air.

Polish forces in the east, fighting alongside the Red army and under Soviet high command, took part in the Soviet offensives across Belarus and Ukraine into Poland and across the Vistula and Oder Rivers to the Battle of Berlin.

In the west, Polish paratroopers from the 1st Independent Polish Parachute Brigade fought in the Battle of Arnhem / Operation Market Garden; while ground troops were present in the North Africa Campaign (siege of Tobruk); the Italian campaign (including the capture of the monastery hill at the Battle of Monte Cassino); and in battles following the invasion of France (the battle of the Falaise pocket; and an armored division in the Western Allied invasion of Germany).

Particularly well-documented was the service of 145 Polish pilots flying British planes under British Command during the Battle of Britain, 79 in mixed squadrons under the RAF after July 1940, 32 in wholly Polish Squadron 303 after 31 August 1940 and 34 in entirely Polish Squadron 302. Other instances of service flying French planes in the Polish Air Force took place during the Battle of Britain at the same time, and from 1944 the Polish Air Force (also with British planes) was established in Britain.

Some Polish contributions were less visible, notably the prewar and wartime decrypting of German Enigma-machine ciphers by cryptologists Marian Rejewski, Henryk Zygalski, and Jerzy Różycki. An extensive Polish intelligence network also proved of great value to Allied intelligence.

The European Theatre of World War II opened with the German invasion of Poland on Friday September 1, 1939, followed by the Soviet invasion of Poland on September 17, 1939. On 6 October, following the Polish defeat at the Battle of Kock, German and Soviet forces gained full control over Poland. The success of the invasion marked the end of the Second Polish Republic, though Poland never formally surrendered. A Polish Underground State with a government-in-exile that would eventually set up headquarters in London resumed the struggle against the occupying powers. The Polish forces in the West, as well as in the East and an intelligence service were established outside of Poland, and contributed to the Allied effort throughout the war.

== Invasion of Poland ==
The invasion of Polish Second Republic by the military forces of Nazi Germany on September 1, 1939, marked the beginning of World War II in Europe. The Soviets invaded Poland on September 17 as had been agreed with Nazi Germany in the Molotov-Ribbentrop Pact.

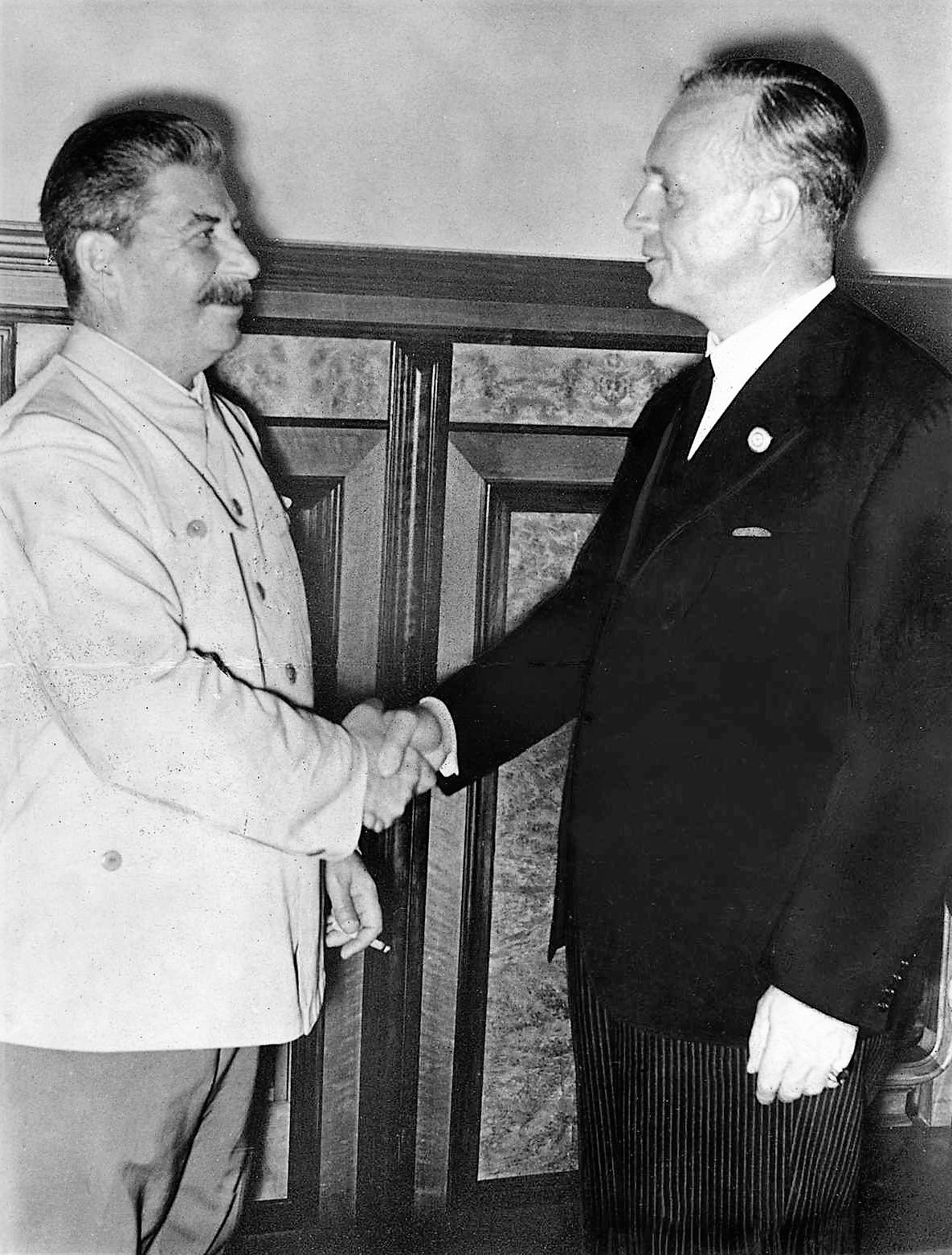
Stalin and Ribbentrop shaking hands after the signing of the pact in the Kremlin

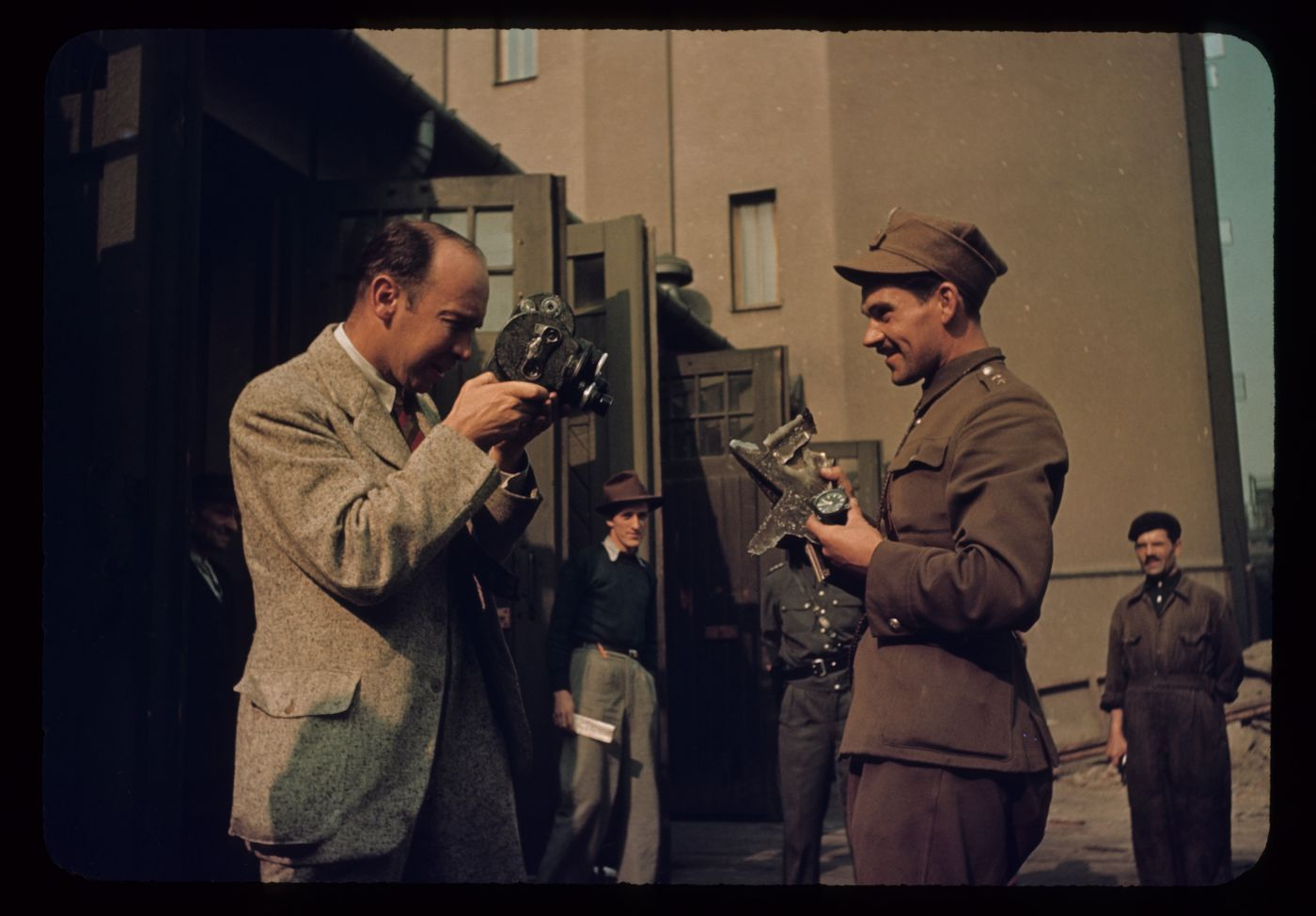
Polish Army soldier showing last remaining part of destroyed German bomber Heinkel He 111 in Warsaw 1939.

In keeping with the terms of the Secret Additional Protocol of the Molotov–Ribbentrop Pact Germany informed the Soviet Union that its forces were nearing the Soviet interest zone in Poland and so urged the Soviet Union to move into its zone. The Soviets had been taken by surprise by the speed of the German advance as they had expected to have several weeks to prepare for an invasion rather than merely a few days. They did promise to move as quickly as possible. On September 17 the Soviets invaded eastern Poland, forcing the Polish government and military to abandon their plans for a long-term defense in the Romanian bridgehead area. The last remaining Polish Army units capitulated in early October.

In accordance with their treaty obligations, the United Kingdom and France declared war on Germany on September 3. Hitler had gambled, incorrectly, that France and Britain would allow him to annex parts of Poland without military reaction. The campaign began on September 1, 1939, one week after the signing of the Molotov–Ribbentrop Pact containing a secret protocol for the division of Northern and Central Europe into German and Soviet spheres of influence. It ended on October 6, 1939, with Germany and the Soviet Union occupying the entirety of Poland.

German losses included about 16,000 killed in action, 28,000 wounded, 3,500 missing, over 200 aircraft, and 30% of their armored vehicles. The Polish casualties were about 66,000 dead and 694,000 captured.

German losses in the Polish campaign amounted to 50% of all casualties they would suffer until their invasion of USSR in 1941; and the campaign that lasted about a month consumed eight months worth of supplies.

== Aid to Jews ==
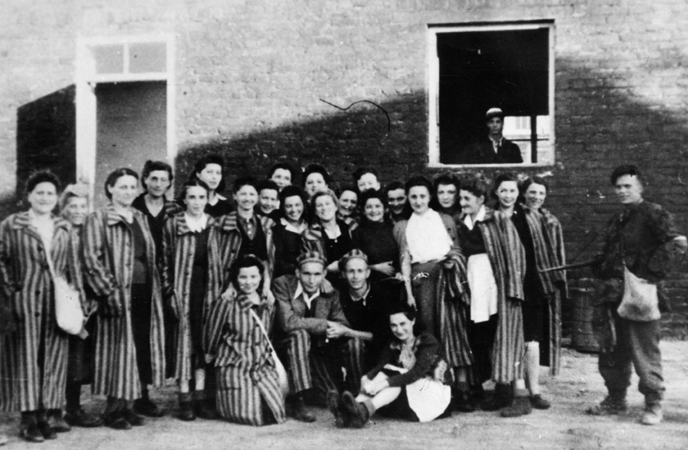
Jewish prisoners liberated by Polish Home Army from German Gęsiówka camp in 1944 Warsaw Uprising

A substantial number of Poles risked their lives in the German occupation to save Jews. German-occupied Poland was the only European territory where the Germans punished any kind of help to Jews with death for the helper and his entire family. Even so, Poland was also the only German-occupied country to establish an organization specifically to aid Jews. Known by the cryptonym Żegota, it provided food, shelter, medical care, money, and false documents to Jews. Most of Żegota's funds came directly from the Polish Government-in-Exile in Great Britain.

Most Jews who survived the German occupation of Poland were saved by Poles unconnected with Żegota. Estimates of Jewish survivors in Poland range from 40,000 to 50,000 to 100,000–120,000. Scholars estimate that it took the work of ten people to save the life of one Polish Jew. Of the individuals awarded medals of Righteous among the Nations (given by the State of Israel to non-Jews who saved Jews from extermination in the Holocaust) those who were Polish citizens number the greatest. There are 6,339 Polish men and women recognized as "Righteous" to this day, amounting to over 25 percent of the total number of 22,765 honorary titles awarded already.

== Polish resistance ==
The main resistance force in German-occupied Poland was the Armia Krajowa ("Home Army"; abbreviated "AK"), which numbered some 400,000 fighters at its peak as well as many more sympathizers. Throughout most of the war, AK was one of the three largest resistance movements in the war.^{[b]} The AK coordinated its operations with the exiled Polish Government in London and its activity concentrated on sabotage, diversion and intelligence gathering. Its combat activity was low until 1943 as the army was avoiding suicidal warfare and preserved its very limited resources for later conflicts that sharply increased when the Nazi war machine started to crumble in the wake of the successes of the Red Army in the Eastern Front. Then the AK started a nationwide uprising (Operation Tempest) against Nazi forces. Before that, AK units carried out thousands of raids, intelligence operations, bombed hundreds of railway shipments, participated in many clashes and battles with the German police and Wehrmacht units and conducted tens of thousands of acts of sabotage against German industry The AK also conducted "punitive" operations to assassinate Gestapo officials responsible for Nazi terror. Following the 1941 German attack on the USSR, the AK assisted the Soviet Union's war effort by sabotaging the German advance into Soviet territory and provided intelligence on the deployment and movement of German forces. After 1943, its direct combat activity increased sharply. German losses to the Polish partisans averaged 850–1,700 per month in early 1944 compared to about 250–320 per month in 1942.

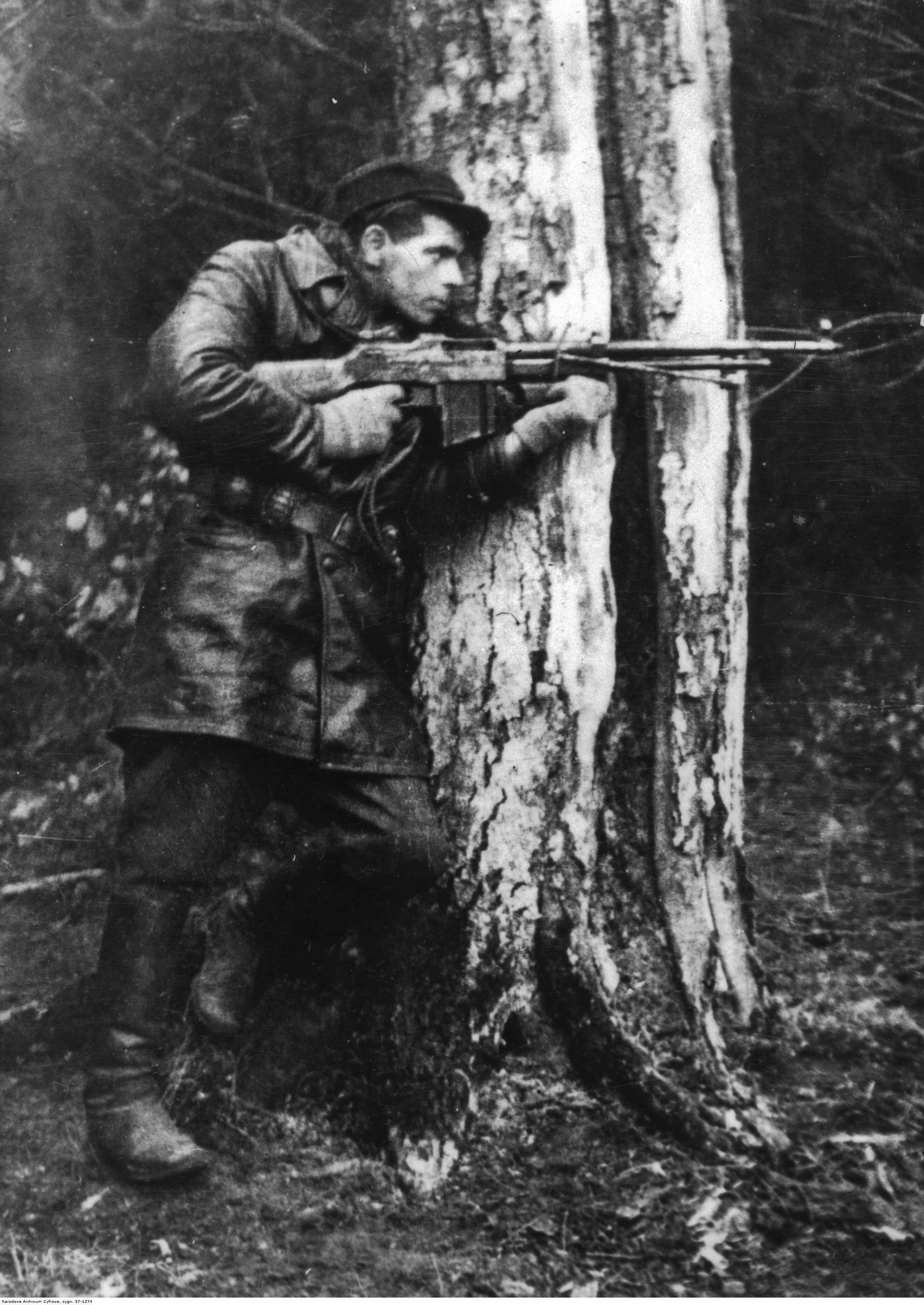
Polish forest partisan Zdzisław de Ville "Zdzich", member of AK "Jędrusie" with Browning wz.1928

In addition to the Home Army, there was an underground ultra-nationalist resistance force called Narodowe Siły Zbrojne (NSZ or "National Armed Forces"), with a fiercely anti-communist stance. It participated in fighting German units, winning many skirmishes. From 1943 onwards, some units took part in battling the Gwardia Ludowa and the Polish People's Army PAL, both communist resistance movement. From 1944, the advancing Red Army was also seen as a foreign occupation force, prompting skirmishes with the Soviets as well as Soviet-backed partisans. In the later part of the war, when Soviet partisans started attacking Polish partisans, sympathizers and civilians, all non-communist Polish formations were (to an increasing extent) becoming involved in actions against the Soviets.

The Armia Ludowa, a Soviet proxy fighting force was another resistance group that was unrelated to the Polish Government in Exile, allied instead to the Soviet Union. As of July, 1944 it incorporated a similar organization, the Gwardia Ludowa and the Polish People's Army PAL, and numbered about 6,000 soldiers (although estimates vary).

There were separate resistance groups organized by Polish Jews: the right-wing Żydowski Związek Walki ("Jewish Fighting Union") (ŻZW) and the more Soviet-leaning Żydowska Organizacja Bojowa ("Jewish Combat Organization") (ŻOB). These organisations cooperated little with each other and their relationship with the Polish resistance varied between occasional cooperation (mainly between ZZW and AK) to armed confrontations (mostly between ŻOB and NZS).

Other notable Polish resistance organizations included the Bataliony Chłopskie (BCh), a mostly peasant-based organization allied to the AK. At its height the BCh included 115,543 members (1944; with additional LSB and PKB-AK Guard, for the estimated total of 150,250 men, not confirmed).

Throughout the war the German state was forced to divert a substantial part of its military forces to keep control over Poland:

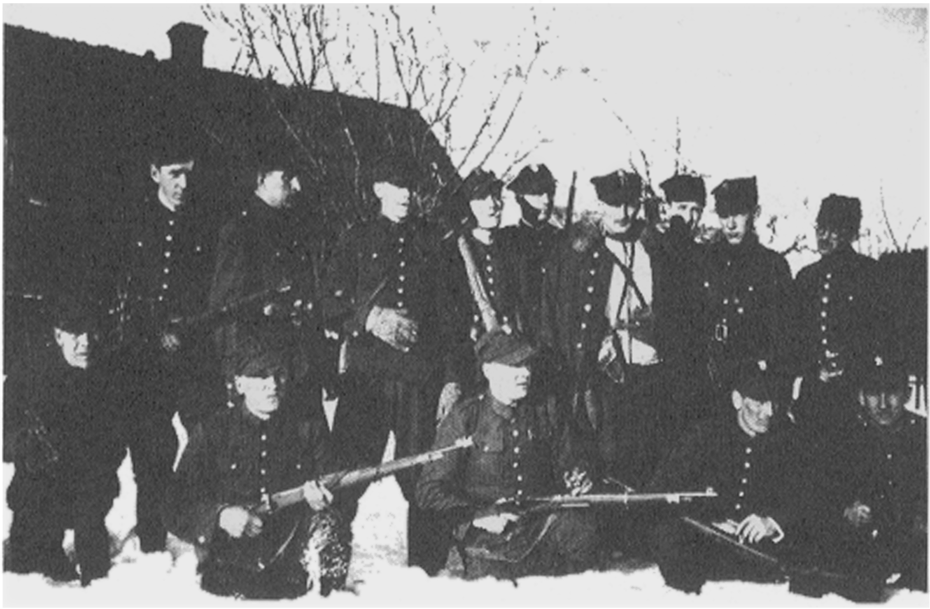
Henryk Dobrzański "Hubal"'s Detached Unit of the Polish Army – first partisan of World War II and his partisan unit – winter 1940

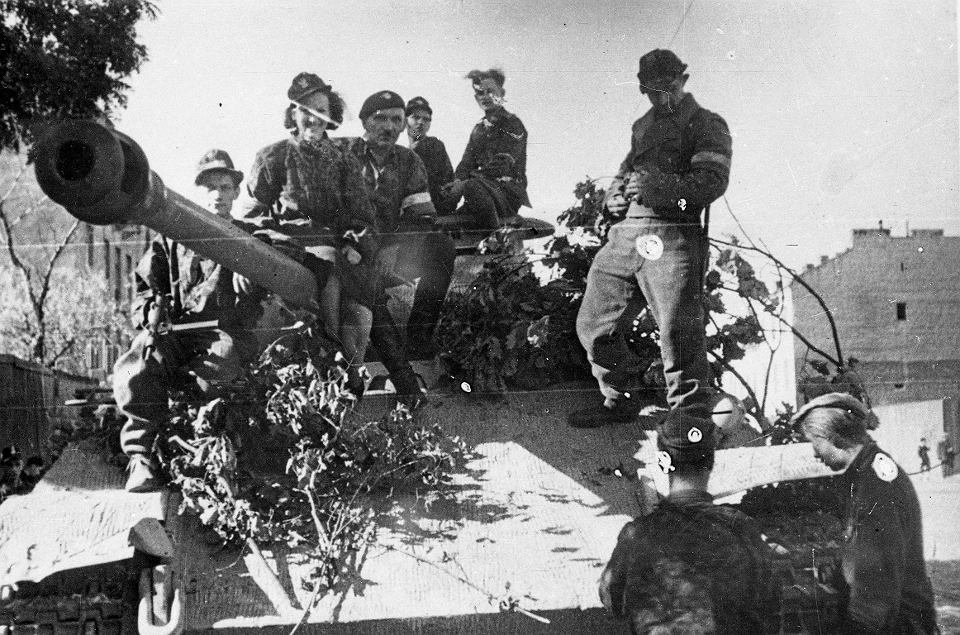
Captured German Panther tank – armored platoon of batalion Zośka under command of Wacław Micuta

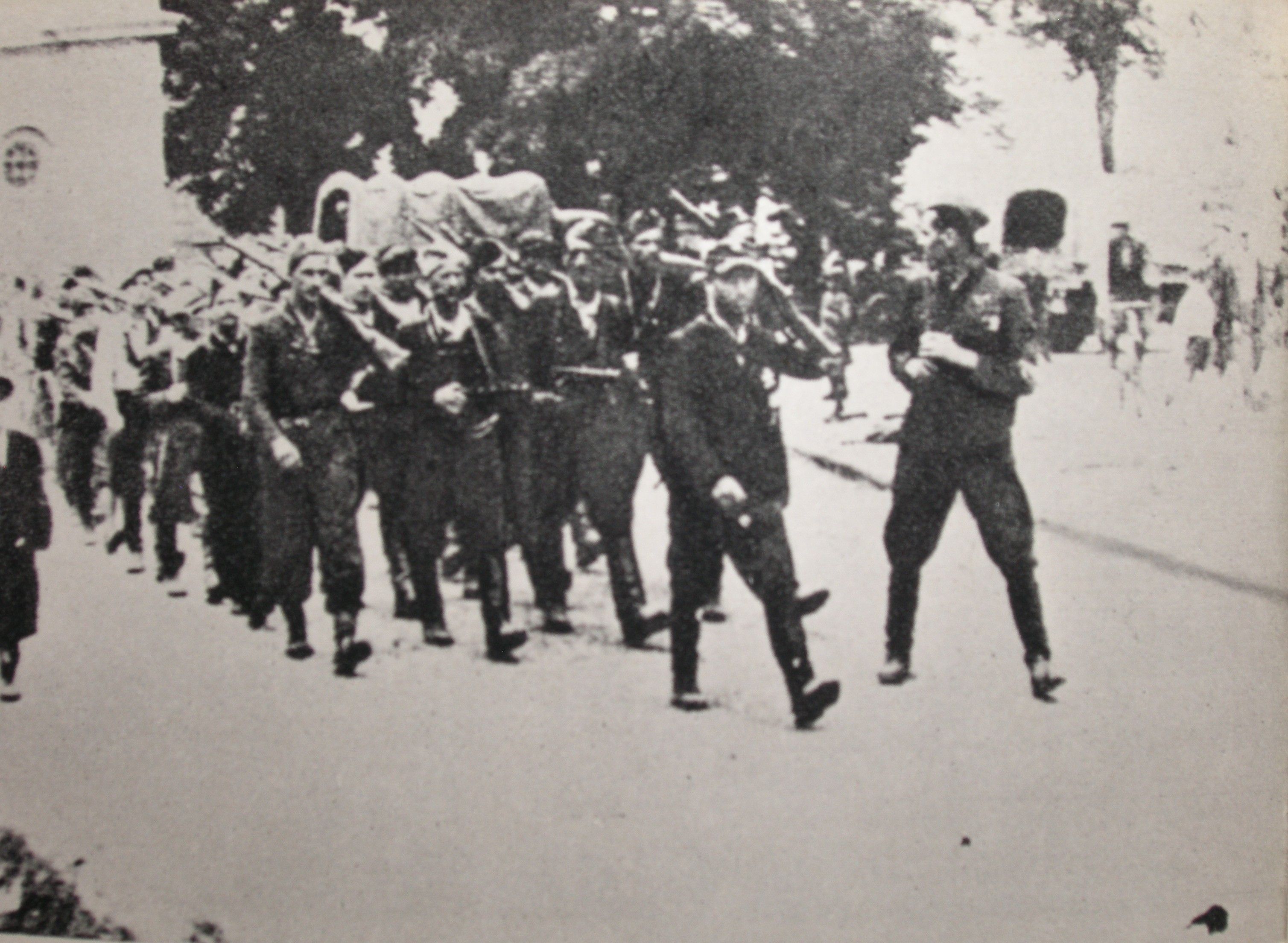
Members of AK "Wiklina" entering Zamość 1944

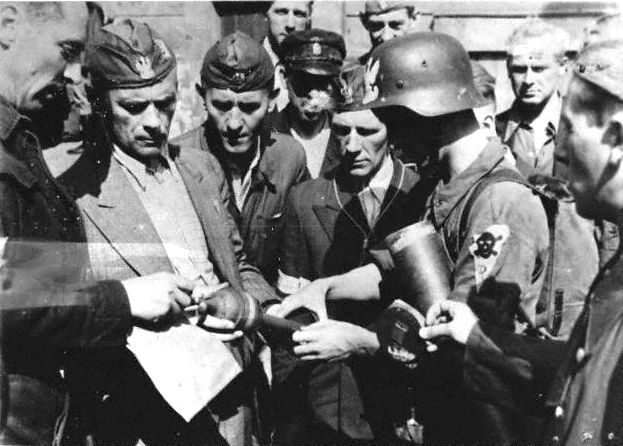
Cyprian Odorkiewicz commander of "Krybar" Regiment (second from left) inspects ammunition for PIAT anti-tank weapon belonging to "Rafałki" unit in the 1944 Warsaw Uprising

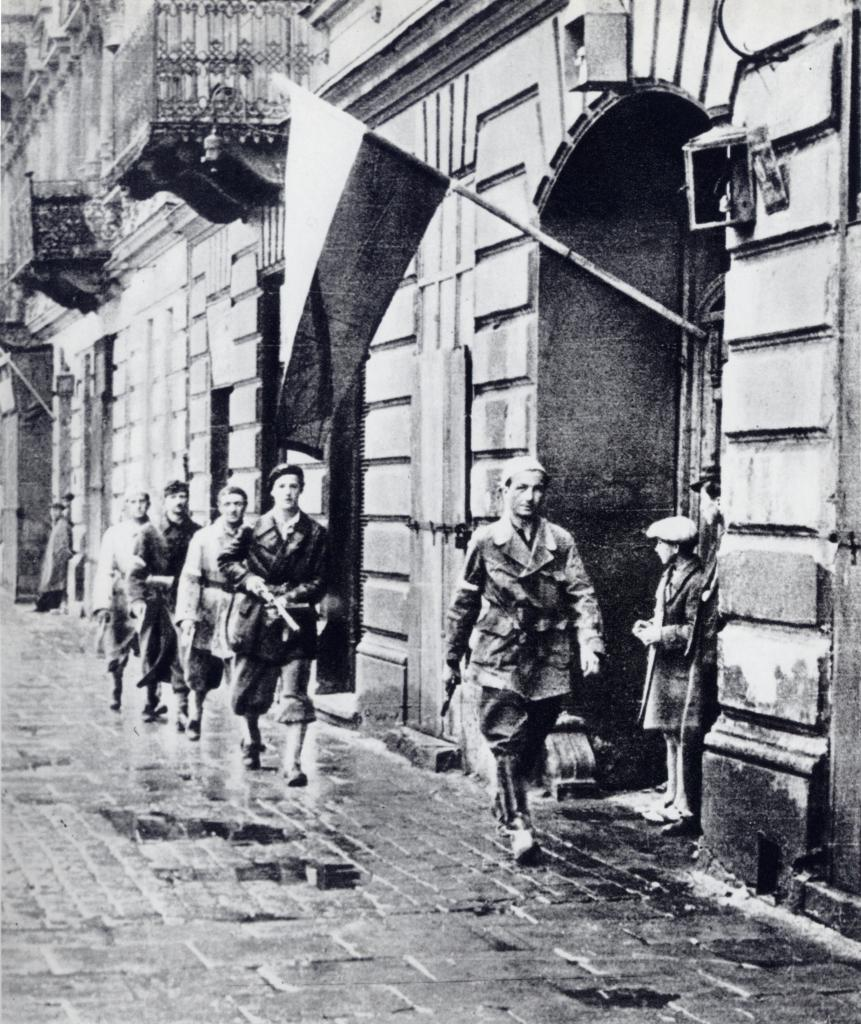
1944 Warsaw Uprising – Patrol of Lieut. Stanisław Jankowski ("Agaton") from Batalion Pięść, 1 August 1944: "W-hour" (17:00)

Number of Wehrmacht and police formations stationed in General Government (does not include annexed territories of Poland and parts of Kresy)
| Period | Wehrmacht | Police and SS (German forces only) | Total |
|---|---|---|---|
| October 1939 | 550,000 | 80,000 | 630,000 |
| April 1940 | 400,000 | 70,000 | 470,000 |
| June 1941 | 2,000,000 (invasion of the Soviet Union) | 50.000 | 2,050,000 |
| February 1942 | 300,000 | 50,000 | 350,000 |
| April 1943 | 450,000 | 60,000 | 510,000 |
| November 1943 | 550,000 | 70,000 | 620,000 |
| April 1944 | 500,000 | 70,000 | 570,000 |
| September 1944 | 1,000,000 | 80,000 | 1,080,000 |

Sabotage and diversionary actions of the Union of Armed Combat (ZWZ) and Home Army (AK) from 1 January 1941 to 30 June 1944
| Action type | Action totals |
|---|---|
| Damaged locomotives | 6,930 |
| Delayed repairs to locomotives | 803 |
| Derailed transports | 732 |
| Transports set on fire | 443 |
| Damage to railway wagons | 19,058 |
| Blown up railway bridges | 38 |
| Disruptions to electricity supplies in the Warsaw grid | 638 |
| Army vehicles damaged or destroyed | 4,326 |
| Damaged aeroplanes | 28 |
| Fuel tanks destroyed | 1,167 |
| Fuel destroyed (in tonnes) | 4,674 |
| Blocked oil wells | 5 |
| Wagons of wood wool destroyed | 150 |
| Military stores burned down | 130 |
| Disruptions of production in factories | 7 |
| Built-in faults in parts for aircraft engines | 4,710 |
| Built-in faults into cannon muzzles | 203 |
| Built-in faults into artillery projectiles | 92,000 |
| Built-in faults into air traffic radio stations | 107 |
| Built-in faults into condensers | 70,000 |
| Built-in faults into (electro-industrial) lathes | 1,700 |
| Damage to important factory machinery | 2,872 |
| Various acts of sabotage performed | 25,145 |
| Planned assassinations of Germans | 5,733 |

== Intelligence ==
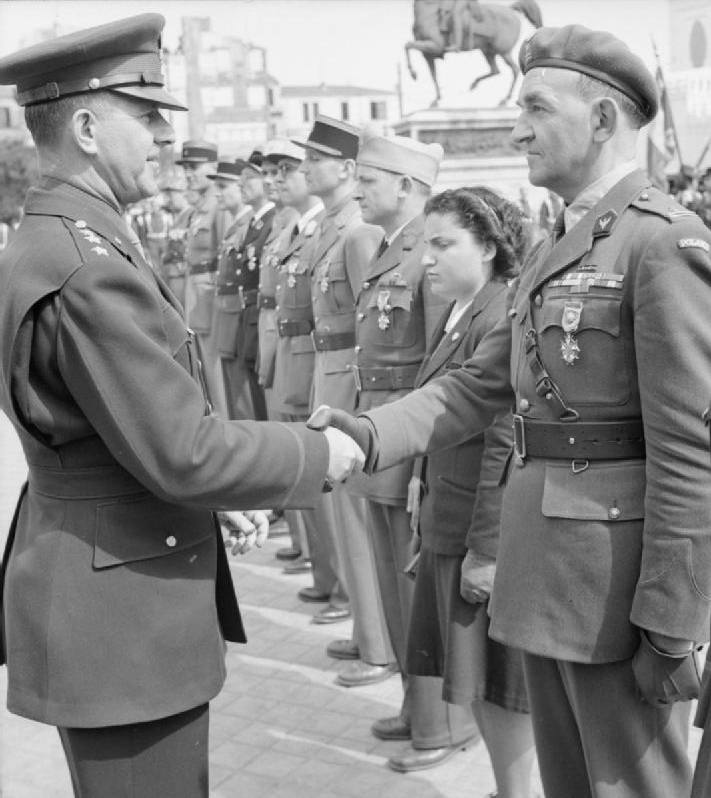
General Jacob Devers with Major Mieczysław Słowikowski, on awarding him the Legion of Merit for his invaluable contributions to the Allied North African campaign.

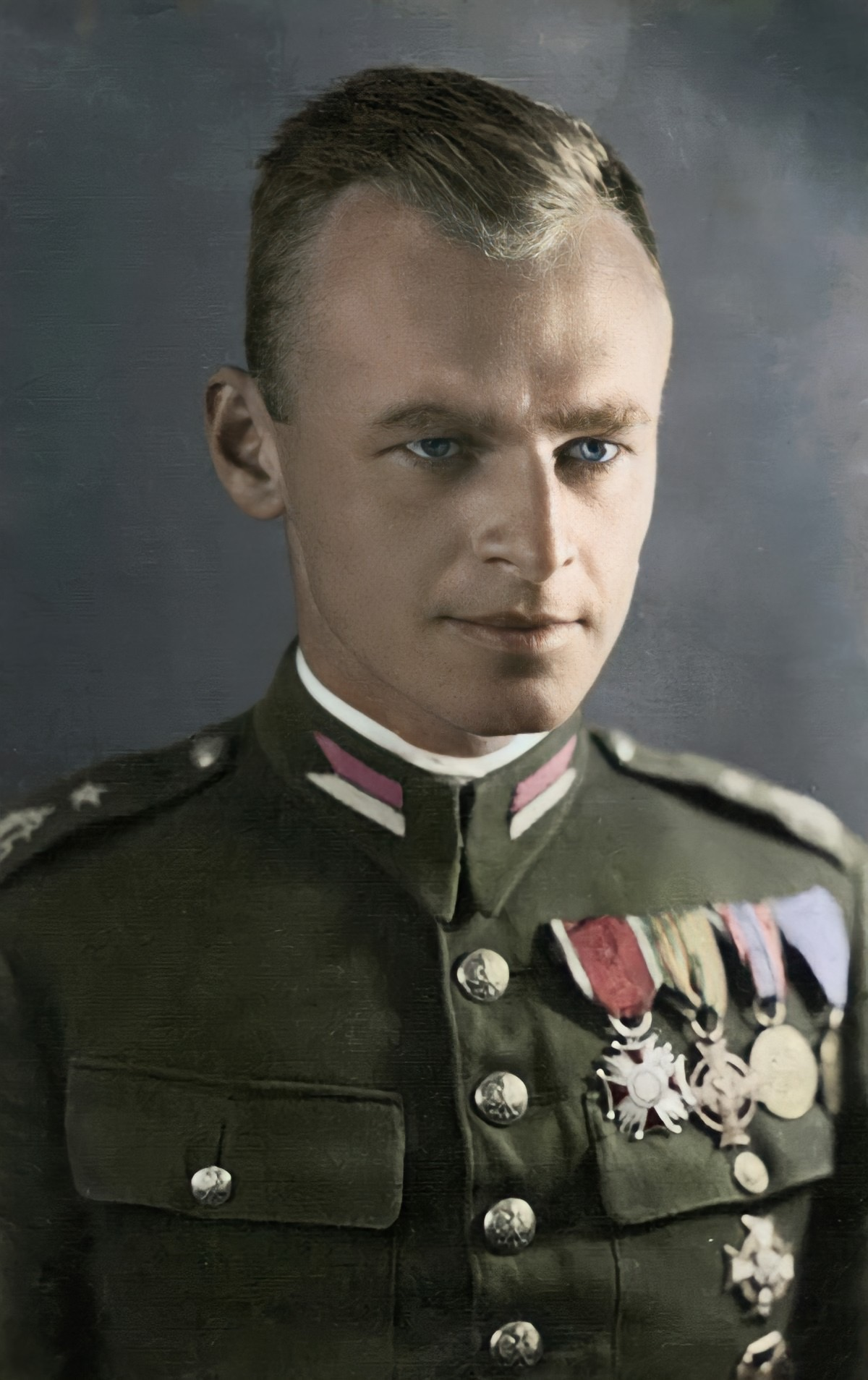
Witold Pilecki, a Polish Army officer and intelligence agent in World War II, the author of Witold's Report, the first detailed Allied intelligence report on Auschwitz concentration camp and the Holocaust

Polish intelligence supplied valuable intelligence to the Allies; 48% of all reports received by the British secret services from continental Europe in between 1939 and 1945 came from Polish sources. The total number of those reports is estimated at 80,000, and 85% of them were deemed high or better quality. Despite Poland becoming occupied, the Polish intelligence network not only survived but grew rapidly, and near the end of the war had over 1,600 registered agents (Another estimate gave about 3,500).

Western Allies had limited intelligence assets in Central and Eastern Europe, and extensive Polish intelligence network in place proved to be a major asset, even described as "the only allied intelligence assets on the Continent" following the French capitulation. According to Marek Ney-Krwawicz, for the Western Allies, the intelligence provided by the Home Army was considered to be the best source of information on the Eastern Front.

In a period of more than six and a half years, from late December 1932 to the outbreak of World War II, three mathematician-cryptologists (Marian Rejewski, Henryk Zygalski and Jerzy Różycki) at the Polish General Staff's Cipher Bureau in Warsaw had developed a number of techniques and devices— including the "grill" method, Różycki's "clock", Rejewski's "cyclometer" and "card catalog", Zygalski's "perforated sheets", and Rejewski's "cryptologic bomb" (in Polish, "bomba", precursor to the later British "Bombe", named after its Polish predecessor)— to facilitate decryption of messages produced on the German "Enigma" cipher machine. Just five weeks before the outbreak of World War II, on July 25, 1939, near Pyry in the Kabaty Woods south of Warsaw, Poland disclosed her achievements to France and the United Kingdom, which had, up to that time, failed in all their own efforts to crack the German military Enigma cipher. Had Poland not shared her Enigma-decryption results at Pyry, the United Kingdom might have been unable to read Enigma ciphers. In the event, intelligence gained from this source, codenamed Ultra, was extremely valuable to the Allied prosecution of the war. While ULTRA's precise influence on its course remains a subject of debate, ULTRA undoubtedly altered the course of the war.

As early as 1940, Polish agents (including Witold Pilecki) penetrated German concentration camps, including Auschwitz, and informed the world about Nazi atrocities. Jan Karski is another important Polish resistance fighter who reported to the Polish government in exile and the Western Allies on the situation in German-occupied Poland, especially the destruction of the Warsaw Ghetto, and the secretive German-Nazi extermination camps.

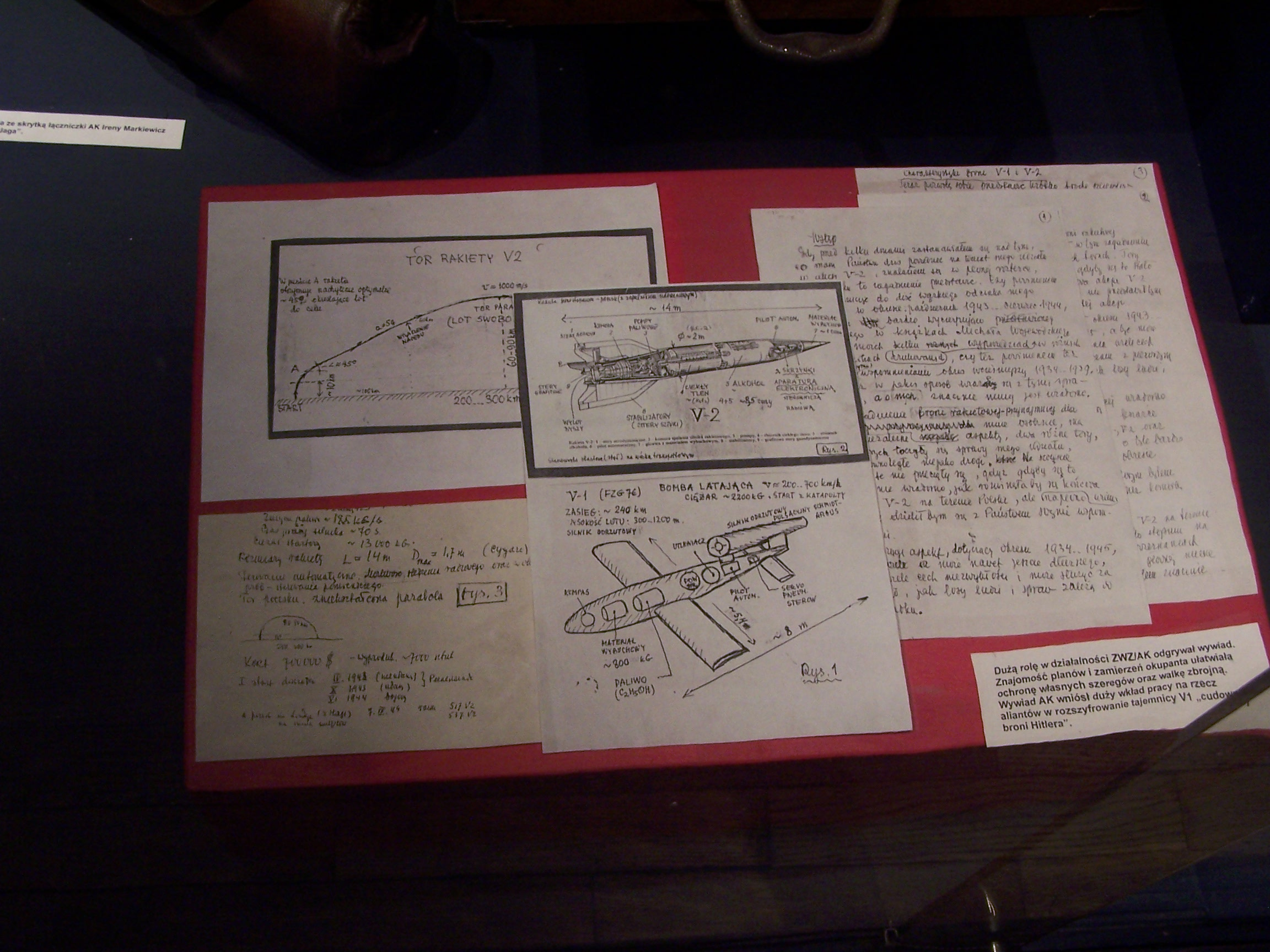
Home Army intelligence report with V1 and V2 schematic drawings.

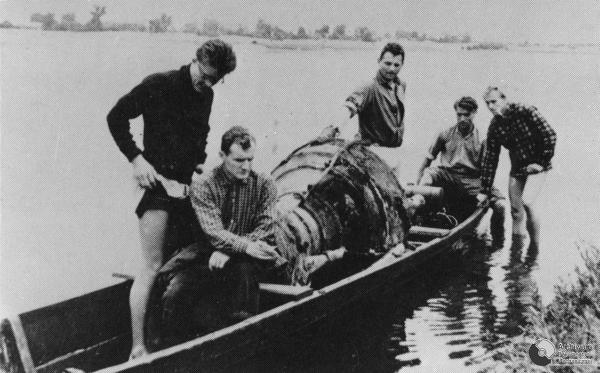
Polish Home Army recovers a V-2 from the Bug River.

Polish Home Army (Armia Krajowa, AK) intelligence was vital to locating and destroying (18 August 1943) the German rocket facility at Peenemünde and to gathering information about Germany's V-1 flying bomb and V-2 rocket. The Home Army delivered to the United Kingdom key V-2 parts after a rocket, fired on 30 May 1944, crashed near a German test facility at Sarnaki on the Bug River and was recovered by the Home Army. On the night of 25–26 July 1944 the crucial parts were flown from occupied Poland to the United Kingdom in an RAF plane, along with detailed drawings of parts too large to fit in the plane (see Home Army and V1 and V2). Analysis of the German rocket became vital to improving Allied anti-V-2 defenses (see Operation Most III).

Operations of the II Bureau, the intelligence service of the Polish government in exile, extended beyond Poland and even beyond Europe. Polish agents provided reports on German war production, morale and troop movements, including information on German submarine operations. The II Bureau is reported to have had two agents in the upper levels of the German high command. Polish intelligence monitored the French fleet at Toulon. Mieczysław Zygfryd Słowikowski has been described as "the only allied agent with a network in North Africa". In July 1941 Mieczysław Słowikowski (codenamed "Rygor"—Polish for "Rigor") set up "Agency Africa", one of World War II's most successful intelligence organizations. His Polish allies in these endeavors included Lt. Col. Gwido Langer and Major Maksymilian Ciężki (prewar heads, respectively, of Poland's Biuro Szyfrów, Cipher Bureau, and of its German section, B.S.-4, which broke Germany's Enigma ciphers). The information gathered by the Agency was used by the Americans and British in planning the amphibious November 1942 Operation Torch landings in North Africa. These were the first large-scale Allied landings of the war, and their success in turn paved the way for the Allies' Italian campaign.

Some Poles also served in other Allied intelligence services, including the celebrated Krystyna Skarbek ("Christine Granville") in the United Kingdom's Special Operations Executive.

The researchers who produced the first Polish-British in-depth monograph on Home Army intelligence (Intelligence Co-operation Between Poland and Great Britain During World War II: Report of the Anglo-Polish Historical Committee of 2005) and who described contributions of Polish intelligence to Allied victory as "disproportionally large" have also argued that "the work performed by Home Army intelligence undoubtedly supported the Allied armed effort much more effectively than subversive and guerilla activities."

== Polish Forces (West) ==
=== Army ===
Polish Armed Forces in the West at the height of their power
| Deserters from the German Wehrmacht | 90,000 |
| Evacuees from the USSR | 83,000 |
| Evacuees from France in 1940 | 35,000 |
| Liberated POWs | 21,750 |
| Escapees from occupied Europe | 14,210 |
| Recruits in liberated France | 7,000 |
| Polonia from Argentina, Brazil and Canada | 2,290 |
| Polonia from the United Kingdom | 1,780 |
| Total | 254,830 |
By July 1945, when recruitment was halted, some 26,830 Polish soldiers were declared KIA or MIA or had died of wounds. After that date, an additional 21,000 former Polish POWs were recruited.

After the country's defeat in the 1939 campaign, the Polish government in exile quickly organized in France a new army of about 75,000 men. In 1940 a Polish Highland Brigade took part in the Battle of Narvik (Norway), and two Polish divisions (First Grenadier Division, and Second Infantry Fusiliers Division) took part in the defense of France, while a Polish motorized brigade and two infantry divisions were in process of forming. A Polish Independent Carpathian Brigade was formed in French Mandate Syria, to which many Polish troops had escaped from Romania. The Polish Air Force in France had 86 aircraft with one and a half of the squadrons fully operational, and the remaining two and a half in various stages of training.

By the fall of France, numerous Polish personnel had died in the fighting (some 6,000) or had been interned in Switzerland (some 13,000). Nevertheless, about 19,000 Polish—about 25% of which were aircrew—were evacuated from France, most alongside other troops transported from western France to the United Kingdom. In 1941, following an agreement between the Polish government in exile and Joseph Stalin, the Soviets released Polish citizens, from whom a 75,000-strong army was formed in the USSR under General Władysław Anders. Without any support from the Soviets to train, equip and maintain this army, the Polish government in exile followed Anders' advice for a transfer of some 80,000 (and about 20,000 civilians), in March and August 1942, across the Caspian Sea to Iran permitting Soviet divisions in occupation there to be released for action. In the Middle East, this "Anders' Army" joined the British Eighth Army, where it formed Polish II Corps.

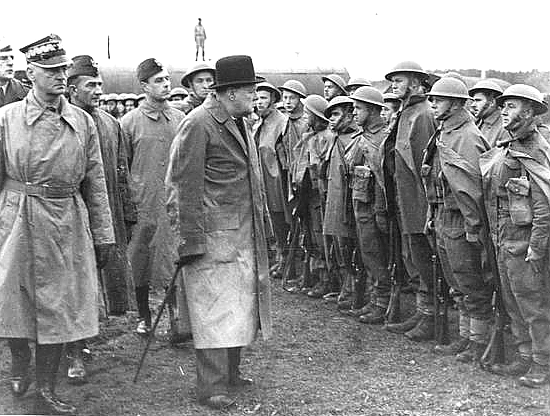
British Prime Minister Winston Churchill reviewing Polish troops in England, 1943.

The Polish Armed Forces in the West fought under British command and numbered 195,000 in March 1944 and 165,000 at the end of that year, including about 20,000 personnel in the Polish Air Force and 3,000 in the Polish Navy. At the end of World War II, the Polish Armed Forces in the west numbered 195,000 and by July 1945 had increased to 228,000, most of the newcomers being released prisoners of war and ex-labor camp inmates.

=== Air force ===
The Polish Air Force first fought in the 1939 Invasion of Poland. Significantly outnumbered and with its fighters outmatched by more advanced German fighters, remained active up to the second week of the campaign, inflicting significant damage on the Luftwaffe. The Luftwaffe lost, to all operational causes, 285 aircraft, with 279 more damaged, while the Poles lost 333 aircraft.

After the fall of Poland many Polish pilots escaped via Hungary to France. The Polish Air Force fought in the Battle of France as one fighter squadron GC 1/145, several small units detached to French squadrons, and numerous flights of industry defence (in total, 133 pilots, who achieved 53–57 victories for a loss of 8 men in combat, what was 7.93% of allied victories).

Later, Polish pilots fought in the Battle of Britain, where the Polish 303 Fighter Squadron claimed the highest number of kills of any Allied squadron. From the very beginning of the war, the Royal Air Force (RAF) had welcomed foreign pilots to supplement the dwindling pool of British pilots. On 11 June 1940, the Polish Government in Exile signed an agreement with the British Government to form a Polish Army and Polish Air Force in the United Kingdom. The first two (of an eventual ten) Polish fighter squadrons went into action in August 1940. Four Polish squadrons eventually took part in the Battle of Britain (300 and 301 Bomber Squadrons; 302 and 303 Fighter Squadrons), with 89 Polish pilots. Together with more than 50 Poles fighting in British squadrons, a total of 145 Polish pilots defended British skies. Polish pilots were among the most experienced in the battle, most of them having already fought in the 1939 September Campaign in Poland and the 1940 Battle of France. Additionally, prewar Poland had set a very high standard of pilot training. The 303 Squadron, named after the Polish–American hero, General Tadeusz Kościuszko, claimed the highest number of kills (126) of all fighter squadrons engaged in the Battle of Britain, even though it only joined the combat on August 30, 1940 These Polish pilots, constituting 5% of the pilots active in the Battle of Britain, were responsible for 12% of total victories in the Battle.

The Polish Air Force also fought in 1943 in Tunisia—the Polish Fighting Team (nicknamed "Skalski's Circus")—and in raids on Germany (1940–45). In the second half of 1941 and early 1942, Polish bomber squadrons formed a sixth of the forces available to RAF Bomber Command but later they suffered heavy losses, with little replenishment possibilities. Polish aircrew losses serving with Bomber Command from 1940 to 1945 were 929 killed. Ultimately eight Polish fighter squadrons were formed within the RAF and had claimed 629 Axis aircraft destroyed by May 1945. By the end of the war, about 19,400 Poles were serving in the RAF.

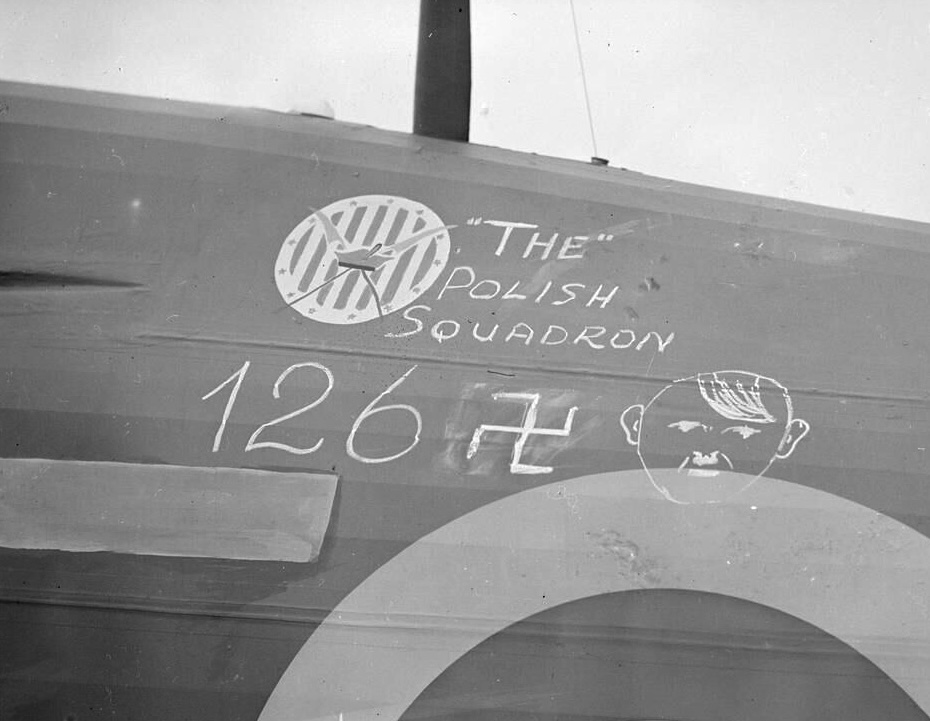
126 German aeroplanes shot down by the 303 squadron in the Battle of Britain. Painted on a Hurricane.

Polish flag flying over the ruins of conquered Monte Cassino monastery, May 1944.

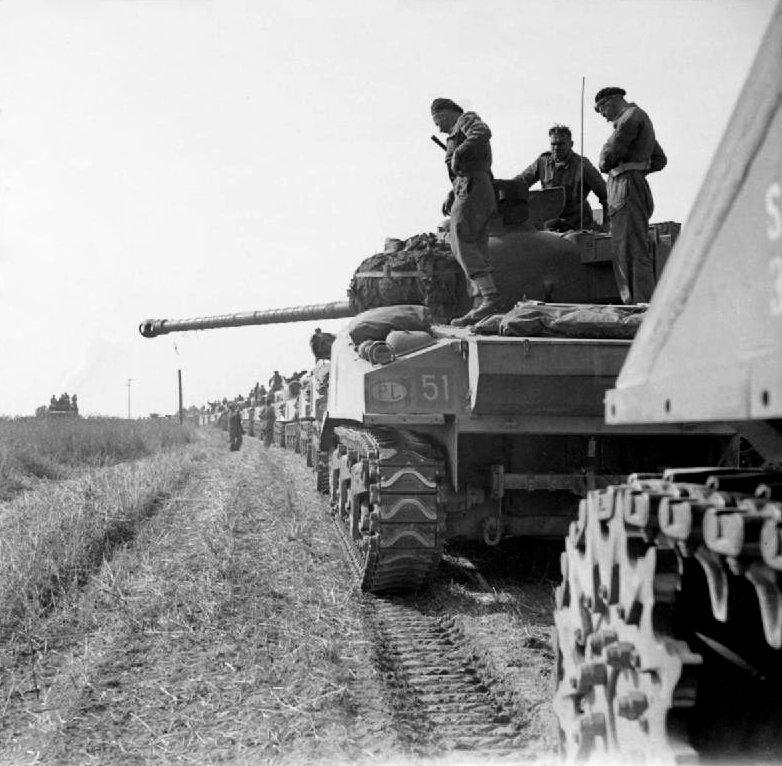
The Polish 1st Armoured Division in the Normandy Campaign, 1944.

Polish squadrons in the United Kingdom:

- No. 300 "Masovia" Polish Bomber Squadron (Ziemi Mazowieckiej)
- No. 301 "Pomerania" Polish Bomber Squadron (Ziemi Pomorskiej)
- No. 302 "City of Poznań" Polish Fighter Squadron (Poznański)
- No. 303 "Kościuszko" Polish Fighter Squadron (Warszawski imienia Tadeusza Kościuszki)
- No. 304 "Silesia" Polish Bomber Squadron (Ziemi Śląskiej imienia Ksiecia Józefa Poniatowskiego)
- No. 305 "Greater Poland" Polish Bomber Squadron (Ziemi Wielkopolskiej imienia Marszałka Józefa Piłsudskiego)
- No. 306 "City of Toruń" Polish Fighter Squadron (Toruński)
- No. 307 "City of Lwów" Polish Fighter Squadron (Lwowskich Puchaczy)
- No. 308 "City of Kraków" Polish Fighter Squadron (Krakowski)
- No. 309 "Czerwien" Polish Fighter-Reconnaissance Squadron (Ziemi Czerwieńskiej)
- No. 315 "City of Dęblin" Polish Fighter Squadron (Dębliński)
- No. 316 "City of Warsaw" Polish Fighter Squadron (Warszawski)
- No. 317 "City of Wilno" Polish Fighter Squadron (Wileński)
- No. 318 "City of Gdansk" Polish Fighter-Reconnaissance Squadron (Gdański)
- No. 663 Polish Artillery Observation Squadron – flying in support of Polish artillery units
- Polish Fighting Team (Skalski's Circus) – attached to No. 145 Squadron RAF
- No. 138 Special Duty Squadron Polish Flight "C"
- No. 1586 Polish Special Duty Flight

Aircraft shot down by Polish squadrons in the West in World War II
| | 1940 | 1941 | 1942 | 1943 | 1944 | 1945 | total |
| destroyed | 266 1/6 | 202 | 90 | 114 3/4 | 103 | 38 1/2 | 769 5/12 |
| probable | 38 | 52 | 36 | 42 | 10 | 2 | 177 |
| damaged | 43 2/3 + 3/5 | 60 1/2 | 43 | 66 | 27 | 18 | 252 1/6 |

=== Navy ===
Just on the eve of war, three destroyers—representing most of the major Polish Navy ships—had been sent for safety to the United Kingdom (Operation Peking). There they fought alongside the Royal Navy. At various stages of the war, the Polish Navy comprised two cruisers and a large number of smaller ships. The Polish navy was given a number of British ships and submarines which would otherwise have been unused due to the lack of trained British crews. The Polish Navy fought with great distinction alongside the other Allied navies in many important and successful operations, including those conducted against the German battleship Bismarck. In the war the Polish Navy operated a total of 27 ships: 2 cruisers, 9 destroyers, 5 submarines and 11 torpedo boats. They sailed a total of 1.2 million nautical miles, escorted 787 convoys, conducted 1,162 patrols and combat operations, sank 12 enemy ships (including 5 submarines) and 41 merchant vessels, damaged 24 more (including 8 submarines) and shot down 20 aircraft. 450 seamen out of the over 4,000 who served with the Navy lost their lives in action.

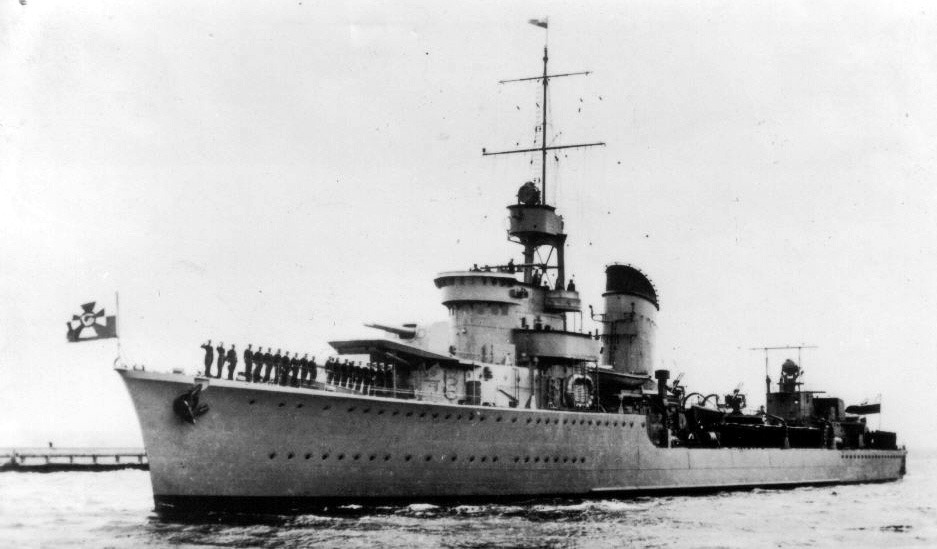
ORP Grom, a destroyer in the Polish Navy

- Cruisers:
  - ORP Dragon Dragoon – (British Danae class)
  - ORP Conrad (British Danae class)
- Destroyers:
  - ORP Wicher – Gale (Wicher class) sunk September 1939
  - ORP Burza – Storm (Wicher class)
  - ORP Grom – Thunder (Grom class) sunk 1940
  - ORP Błyskawica – Lightning (Grom class)
  - ORP Garland (British G class)
  - ORP Orkan – Windstorm (British M-class destroyer Myrmidion) sunk 1943
  - ORP Ouragan, sometimes called Huragan– Hurricane (French Bourrasque class)
  - ORP Piorun – Thunderbolt (British N class)
- Escort destroyers:
  - ORP Krakowiak – Cracovian (British Hunt class) 1941–1946
  - ORP Kujawiak – Kujawian (British Hunt class)
  - ORP Ślązak – Silesian (British Hunt class)
- Submarines:
  - ORP Orzeł – Eagle (Orzeł class) lost 1940
  - ORP Sęp – Vulture (Orzeł class) interned Sweden
  - ORP Jastrząb – Hawk (USN S class)
  - ORP Wilk – Wolf (Wilk class) to reserve 1942
  - ORP Ryś – Lynx (Wilk class) interned Sweden
  - ORP Żbik 1930 (6) – Wildcat (Wilk class) interned Sweden
  - ORP Dzik – Boar (British U class) 1942–1946
  - ORP Sokół – Falcon (British U class) 1941–1945
- Heavy minelayers:
  - ORP Gryf – Griffin sunk 1939
- Light minelayers ("ptaszki"– "Birds"):
  - ORP Jaskółka – Swallow, sunk 1939
  - ORP Mewa (1935) – Seagull
  - ORP Rybitwa – Tern
  - ORP Czajka – Lapwing
  - ORP Żuraw – Crane
  - ORP Czapla – Heron
- Polish River Fleet

This does not include a number of minor ships, transports, merchant-marine auxiliary vessels, and patrol boats. Polish Merchant Navy contributed about 137,000 BRT to Allied shipping; losing 18 ships (with capacity of 76,000 BRT) and over 200 sailors in the war.

== Polish Forces (East) ==
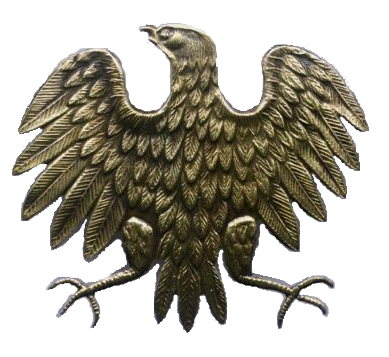
The "Piast eagle" (specimen 43) worn by the soldiers of the Polish 1st Tadeusz Kościuszko Infantry Division of the Polish Armed Forces of the East.

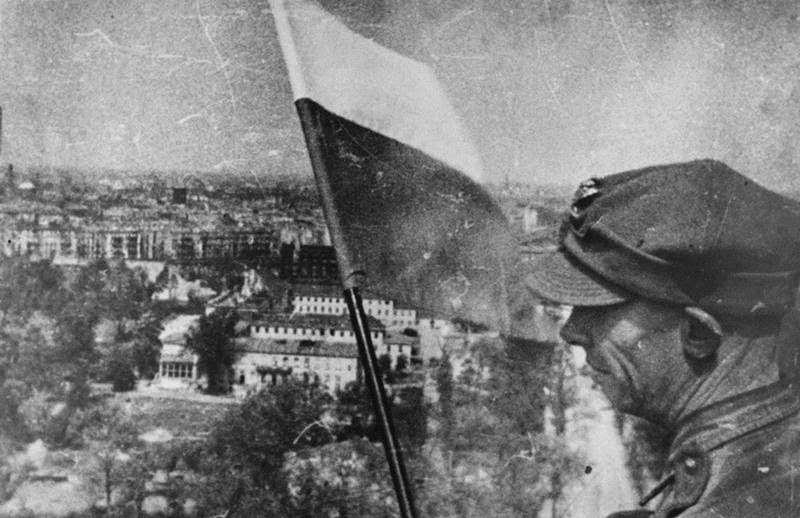
Polish flag raised on the top of Berlin Victory Column on May 2, 1945.

After the Polish government-in-exile organized the Anders Army in 1941 in the Soviet Union in the aftermath of the Operation Barbarossa and evacuated it to the West, Polish communists sought to create a new army, under communist control, out of the many ethnic Poles that remained in the Soviet Union. These were primarily citizens of the prewar Second Polish Republic that had been deported and often imprisoned by the Soviets following the Soviet annexation of Poland's eastern territories, as per the Molotov-Ribbentrop Pact. The Soviet Union created the Union of Polish Patriots (ZPP) in 1943, a communist Polish organization intended to represent the interest of Poles on Soviet soil and organize this new army. The relocated Poles, along with numbers of Byelorussians, Ukrainians, and Polish Jews, were organized into a division, the nucleus of a force known as the Polish People's Army (Ludowe Wojsko Polskie, LWP) but colloquially known as the Berling Army after its first commander, Zygmunt Berling. The division made its combat debut in October 1943 at the Battle of Lenino. Afterwards, it was rapidly expanded into the 1st Polish Corps, which in turn grew by 1944 into the 1st Polish Army. In 1945, 2nd Polish Army was added to the LWP. By the end of the war, the LWP numbered about 200,000 front-line soldiers. The Polish communist guerilla force, the Armia Ludowa, was integrated with the Polish People's Army in January 1944.

The Polish First Army was integrated in the 1st Belorussian Front with which it entered Poland from Soviet territory in 1944. In the 1944 Warsaw Uprising it liberated the suburb of Praga, but otherwise sat out most of the battle, aside from a series of unsuccessful crossings of the Vistula in mid-September. It took part in battles for Bydgoszcz (Bromberg), Kolobrzeg (Kolberg), Gdańsk (Danzig) and Gdynia, losing about 17,500 killed in action over the course of the war. In April–May 1945 the 1st Army fought in the final capture of Berlin. The Polish Second Army fought as part of the Soviet 1st Ukrainian Front and took part in the Prague Offensive. In the final operations of the war the casualties of the two armies of the LWP amounted to about 67,000.

== Poles in the German Armed Forces ==
Hundreds of thousands of former Polish citizens, particularly residents of parts of Poland annexed to Germany, were conscripted into the German Armed Forces. Also, a number of former Polish citizens, especially members of the prewar German minority in Poland (see Volksliste), volunteered for service in the German Armed Forces. These were mostly members of the German minority in Poland who were considered by the Nazi authorities to be ethnically German (Volksdeutsche). In 1939 in the Invasion of Poland they created the paramilitary organisation Volksdeutscher Selbstschutz, and actively supported German forces in occupied Poland.

On the Western Front, German military personnel of Polish ethnicity, held in prisoner-of-war camps, became a substantial source of manpower for the Polish Armed Forces in the West. Nearly 90,000 former German military personnel were eventually recruited into the Polish Armed Forces in the West. By Victory Day (9 May) in 1945, a third of Polish service members in the West were former members of the German Armed Forces.

== Battles ==
Major battles and campaigns in which Polish regular forces took part:

| Battle | Date | Location | Poland and its allies | Enemies | Result |
Invasion of Poland (1939)
| Invasion of Poland | 1 September – 6 October 1939 | Poland | Poland | Germany Soviet Union Slovakia | Defeat |
| Battle of Westerplatte | 1–7 September 1939 | Poland | Poland | Germany Free City of Danzig | Defeat |
| Battle of Mokra | 1 September 1939 | Poland | Poland | Germany | Victory |
| Battle of the Border | 1–4 September 1939 | Poland | Poland | Germany | Defeat |
| Raid on Fraustadt | 2 September 1939 | Germany | Poland | Germany | Victory |
| Battle of Wizna | 7–10 September 1939 | Poland | Poland | Germany | Defeat |
| Battle of Warsaw | 8–28 September 1939 | Poland | Poland | Germany | Defeat |
| Battle of the Bzura | 9–19 September 1939 | Poland | Poland | Germany | Defeat |
| Battle of Lwów | 12–22 September 1939 | Poland | Poland | Germany Soviet Union | Defeat |
| Battle of Tomaszów Lubelski | 17–26 September 1939 | Poland | Poland | Germany | Defeat |
| Battle of Wilno | 18–19 September 1939 | Poland | Poland | Soviet Union | Defeat |
| Battle of Grodno | 20–24 September 1939 | Poland | Poland | Soviet Union | Defeat |
| Battle of Szack | 28 September 1939 | Poland | Poland | Soviet Union | Victory |
| Battle of Kock | 2–5 October 1939 | Poland | Poland | Germany | Defeat |
Armed Forces in the West (1939–1945)
| Battle of the Atlantic | 3 September 1939 – 8 May 1945 | Atlantic Ocean | United Kingdom United States (from 1941) Canada Poland Norway Netherlands Belgium France (until 1940) Free France (from 1940) Brazil (from 1942) | Germany Italy (until 1943) | Victory |
| Norwegian campaign | 9 April – 10 June 1940 | Norway | Norway United Kingdom France Poland | Germany | Defeat |
| Battle of Narvik | 9 April – 8 June 1940 | Norway | Norway United Kingdom France Poland | Germany | Victory |
| Battle of France | 10 May – 25 June 1940 | France | France Belgium Netherlands United Kingdom Canada Poland Czechoslovakia Luxembourg | Germany Italy | Defeat |
| Battle of Dunkirk | 26 May – 4 June 1940 | France | United Kingdom Canada France Poland Belgium Netherlands | Germany | Retreat |
| Battle of Britain | 10 July – 31 October 1940 | United Kingdom (airspace) | United Kingdom Canada with pilots from Poland Czechoslovakia Australia New Zealand South Africa Free France Norway United States Ireland Southern Rhodesia Jamaica Barbados Newfoundland Northern Rhodesia | Germany Italy | Victory |
| North African Campaign | 10 June 1940 – 13 May 1943 | North Africa | United Kingdom Australia New Zealand South Africa Southern Rhodesia India United States Poland Czechoslovakia Free France Greece | Italy Germany Vichy France | Victory |
| Battle of Tobruk | 10 April – 27 November 1941 | Libya | Australia Poland Czechoslovakia United Kingdom India | Germany Italy | Victory |
| Sinking of the Bismarck | 26–27 May 1941 | Atlantic Ocean | United Kingdom Poland | Germany | Victory |
| Operation Crusader | 18 November – 30 December 1941 | Libya | United Kingdom India Australia New Zealand South Africa Poland Czechoslovakia | Germany Italy | Victory |
| Dieppe Raid | 19 August 1942 | France | Canada United Kingdom United States Free France Poland | Germany | Defeat |
| Italian Campaign | 10 July 1943 – 2 May 1945 | Italy | United Kingdom United States Canada Australia New Zealand Poland (from 1944) Free France Brazil (from 1944) (Kingdom of Greece) Greece India (Kingdom of Italy) Italian Co-Belligerent Army (from September 1943) Italian Resistance Yugoslavia | Germany Italy (until September 1943) Italian Social Republic (from September 1943) | Victory |
| Battle of Monte Cassino | 17 January – 18 May 1944 | Italy | United Kingdom Poland United States Canada Free France Australia New Zealand South Africa India (Kingdom of Italy) Italian Co-Belligerent Army | Germany Italian Social Republic | Victory |
| Normandy Landings | 6 June 1944 | France | United Kingdom United States Canada Australia New Zealand Poland Netherlands Belgium Free France Czechoslovakia Norway Denmark (Kingdom of Greece) Greece Luxembourg | Germany | Victory |
| Invasion of Normandy | 6 June – 30 August 1944 | France | United Kingdom United States Canada Australia New Zealand Poland Netherlands Belgium Free France Czechoslovakia Norway (Kingdom of Greece) Greece Luxembourg | Germany | Victory |
| Battle of Ancona | 16 June – 18 July 1944 | Italy | Poland United Kingdom | Germany | Victory |
| Operation Totalize | 8–9 August 1944 | France | Canada Poland United Kingdom | Germany | Victory |
| Battle of Falaise | 12–21 August 1944 | France | United Kingdom United States Canada Poland Free France | Germany | Victory |
| Operation Tractable | 14–21 August 1944 | France | Canada Poland United Kingdom | Germany | Victory |
| Siegfried Line Campaign | 25 August 1944 – 7 March 1945 | France/Germany | United Kingdom United States Canada Poland France | Germany | Victory |
| Hill 262 | 12–21 August 1944 | France | Poland | Germany | Victory |
| Operation Market Garden | 17–25 September 1944 | Netherlands/Germany | United Kingdom United States Canada Poland (Netherlands) Dutch resistance | Germany | Defeat |
| Battle of Arnhem | 17–26 September 1944 | Netherlands | United Kingdom Poland | Germany | Defeat |
| Battle of the Scheldt | 2 October – 8 November 1944 | Belgium/Netherlands | United Kingdom United States Canada Poland France Belgium Netherlands Norway | Germany | Victory |
| Gothic Line | late August 1944 – early March 1945 | Italy | United Kingdom United States Canada Poland India New Zealand South Africa Brazil Greece Italian Resistance | Germany | Indecisive |
| Western Allied invasion of Germany | 22 March – 8 May 1945 | Germany | United States United Kingdom Canada France Poland Norway Denmark Netherlands Belgium | Germany (Kingdom of Hungary (1920–1946)) Hungary | Victory |
| Spring 1945 offensive in Italy | 6 April – 2 May 1945 | Italy | United States United Kingdom Poland Italy Brazil India New Zealand South Africa Yugoslavia | Germany Italian Social Republic | Victory |
| Battle of Bologna | 9–21 April 1945 | Italy | Poland United Kingdom United States Italy Brazil | Germany | Victory |
Armed Forces in the East (1943–1945)
| Battle of Lenino | 12–13 October 1943 | Soviet Union (Belarus) | Soviet Union Poland | Germany | Indecisive |
| Operation Bagration | 22 June – 19 August 1944 | Soviet Union/Poland | Soviet Union Poland | Germany | Victory |
| Lvov–Sandomierz Offensive | 13 July – 29 August 1944 | Ukraine/Poland | Soviet Union Polish Underground State | Germany (Kingdom of Hungary (1920–1946)) Hungary | Victory |
| Lublin-Brest Offensive | 18 July – 2 August 1944 | Belarus/Poland | Soviet Union Poland | Germany Romania | Victory |
| Battle of Studzianki | 9–16 August 1944 | Poland | Soviet Union Poland | Germany | Victory |
| Vistula-Oder Offensive | 12 January – 2 February 1945 | Poland | Soviet Union Poland | Germany | Victory |
| Battle of Poznań | 24 January – 23 February 1945 | Poland | Soviet Union Poland | Germany (Kingdom of Hungary (1920–1946)) Hungary | Victory |
| East Pomeranian Offensive | 24 February – 4 April 1945 | Poland/Germany | Soviet Union Poland | Germany | Victory |
| Battle of Kolberg | 4–18 March 1945 | Germany | Soviet Union Poland | Germany | Victory |
| Battle of Berlin | 16 April – 2 May 1945 | Germany | Soviet Union Poland | Germany | Victory |
| Battle of the Seelow Heights | 16–19 April 1945 | Germany | Soviet Union Poland | Germany | Victory |
| Battle of Bautzen | 21–30 April 1945 | Germany | Soviet Union Poland | Germany | Indecisive |
| Prague Offensive | 6 – 11 May 1945 | Czechoslovakia | Soviet Union Poland Czechoslovakia Romania (Russia) Russian Liberation Army | Germany (Kingdom of Hungary (1920–1946)) Hungary Slovakia | Victory |
Underground actions (1939–1945)
| Detached Unit of the Polish Army (Hubal's partisans) | October 1939 – 30 April 1940 | Poland | (Poland) Polish resistance | Germany | Defeat |
| Czortków uprising | 21–22 January 1940 | Poland | (Poland) Anti-Soviet Polish students | Soviet Union | Defeat |
| Polish resistance in France | 1940–1944 | France | (Free France) French Resistance (Polish Underground State) Polish resistance | Germany | Victory |
| Zamość uprising | December 1942 – mid-1944 | Poland | Polish Underground State supported by (Soviet Union) Soviet partisans | Germany | Victory |
| Operacja Główki | 1943–1944 | Poland | Polish Underground State | Germany | Partial success |
| Warsaw Ghetto Uprising | 19 April – 16 May 1943 | Poland | Jewish Combat Organization Jewish Military Union assisted by Polish Underground State People's Guard | Germany | Defeat |
| Operation Belt | 20–21 August 1943 | Poland | Polish Underground State | Germany | Victory |
| Operation Chain | late November 1943 | Poland | Polish Underground State | Germany | Victory |
| Operation Tempest | January–October 1944 | Poland | Polish Underground State | Germany | Partial success |
| Battle of Murowana Oszmianka | 13–14 May 1944 | Poland/Belarus | Polish Underground State | (Lithuania) Lithuanian Territorial Defense Force | Victory |
| Battle of Porytowe Wzgórze | 14–15 June 1944 | Poland | Polish Underground State (Soviet Union) Soviet partisans | Germany | Victory |
| Battle of Osuchy | 25–26 June 1944 | Poland | Polish Underground State | Germany | Defeat |
| Operation Ostra Brama | 7 – 15 July 1944 | Poland/Lithuania | Polish Underground State Soviet Union | Germany | Tactical victory |
| Lwów Uprising | 23–27 July 1944 | Poland/Ukraine | Polish Underground State | Germany | Victory |
| Warsaw Uprising | 1 August – 2 October 1944 | Poland | Polish Underground State (Poland) Polish Army in the East aerial supply only United Kingdom United States South Africa limited aid | Germany | Defeat |
| Battle of Kuryłówka | 7 May 1945 | Poland | Polish Underground State | Soviet Union | Victory |
| Attack on the NKVD Camp in Rembertów | 21 May 1945 | Poland | Polish Underground State | Soviet Union | Victory |
| Augustów roundup | 20–25 July 1945 | Poland | Polish Underground State | Soviet Union Communist Poland | Defeat |

== Technology ==
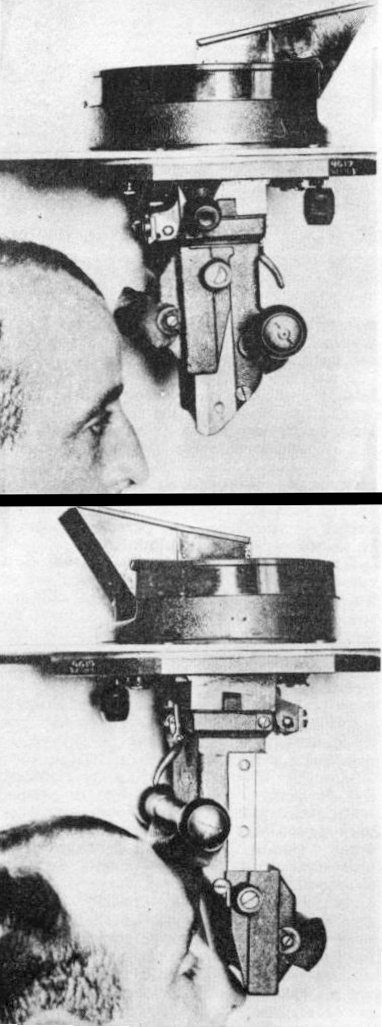
360 degree tank periscope of Polish inventor Rudolf Gundlach was first used in Polish 7TP tank.

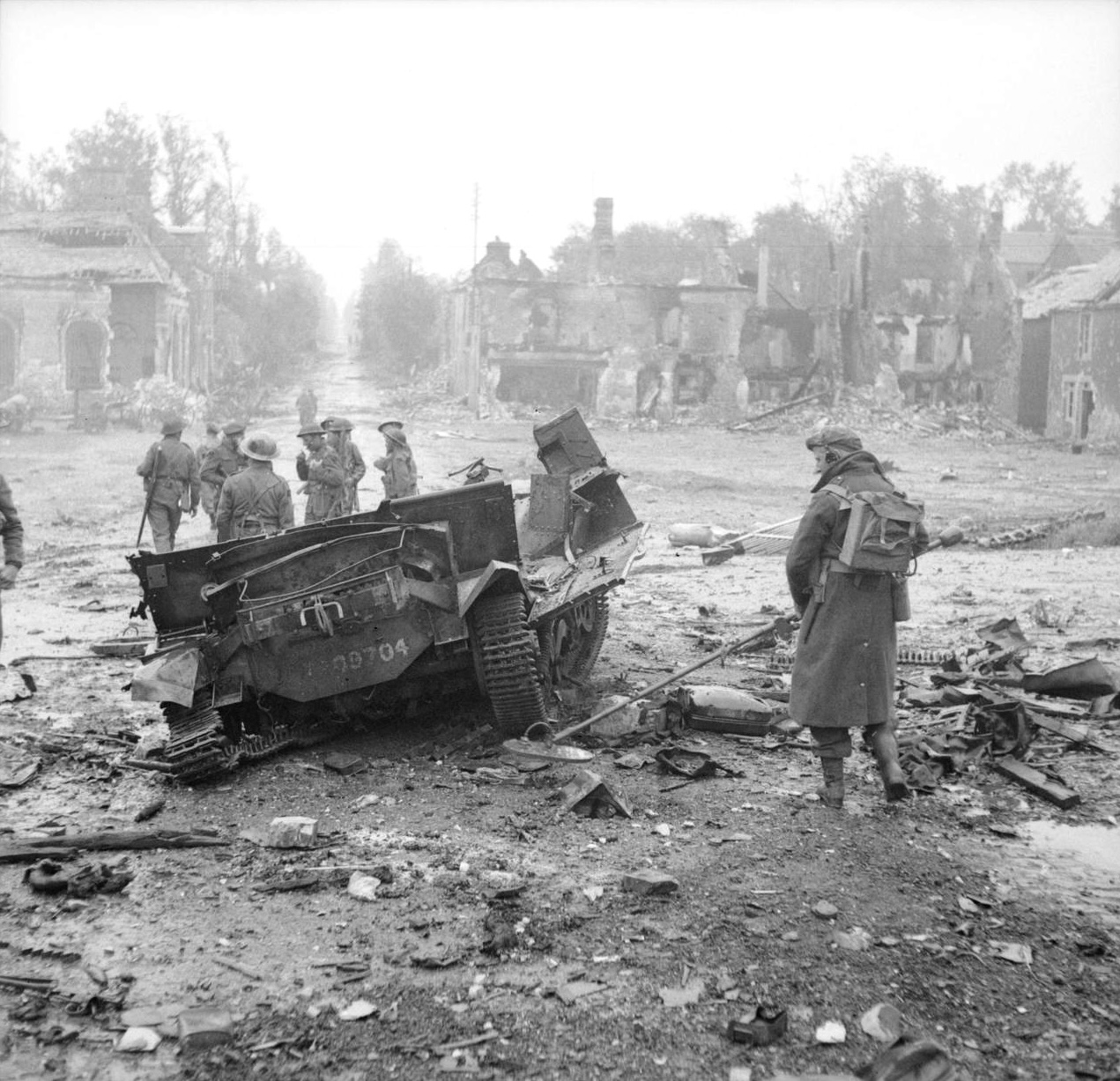
Polish mine detector of Józef Kosacki being used close to a Universal Carrier that has been destroyed by a mine, Tilly-sur-Seulles, France (June 1944)

- Józef Kosacki invented the Polish mine detector, which would be used by the Allies from 1942.
- The Vickers Tank Periscope MK.IV was invented by engineer Rudolf Gundlach and patented in 1936 as the Gundlach Peryskop obrotowy. Initially it was mounted in Polish tanks such as the 7TP and TKS. Subsequently, the design patent was sold to the British for a nominal sum and used in most tanks of World War II, including the Soviet T-34, the British Crusader, Churchill, Valentine and Cromwell tanks, and the American M4 Sherman. The main advantage of the periscope was that the tank commander no longer had to turn his head in order to look backwards. The design was also later used extensively by the Germans.
- pistolet wz. 35 Vis, often simply called the "Radom" in English sources, is a 9 mm caliber, single-action, semi-automatic pistol. It was adopted in 1935 as the standard handgun of the Polish Army. The design was appropriated by the Germans and from 1939 to 1945, 312,000–380,000 VIS pistols were produced and used by the German paratroopers and police as the 9 mm Pistole 35(p).
- PZL.37 Łoś was a Polish twin-engine medium bomber designed in the mid-1930s at the PZL factory in Warsaw by Jerzy Dąbrowski, and used operationally in the Invasion of Poland in 1939. Thanks to the laminar-flow wing it was one of the most modern bombers in the world before World War II.
- Swiatecki bomb slip, a bomb-release system was invented by Władysław Świątecki in 1925 and patented in the 1926 in Poland and abroad. Some components was used in the pre-war Polish PZL.37 Łoś (Elk) bomber. In 1940 Świątecki's invention was taken over by the British, who used it in the Avro Lancaster bomber. In 1943, an updated version was created by Jerzy Rudlicki for the American B-17 Flying Fortress.
- Wz. 35 anti-tank rifle, 7.92 mm anti-tank rifle developed in secret and used by the Polish Army in the invasion of Poland invented by Józef Maroszek. The rifle was a development of the Mauser rifle with its own special 7.92 mm cartridge with a muzzle velocity of over 1,000 meters per second. With a range of 300 metres it was very effective against all German tanks of the period (the Panzer I, II and III, as well as the Czech-made LT-35 and LT-38 tanks in German service) at 100 meters.
- In World War II, there was an important need to take bearings on the high frequency radio transmissions used by the German Kriegsmarine. The engineering of such high frequency direction finding systems for operation on ships presented severe technical problems, mainly due to the effects of the superstructure on the wavefront of arriving radio signals. However, solutions to these problems were proposed by the Polish engineer Waclaw Struszynski, who also led the team which developed the first practical system at the Admiralty Signal Establishment, England. These systems were installed on convoy escort ships, and were very effective against the U-boats in the Battle of the Atlantic. The father of Wacław Struszyński was Professor Marceli Struszyński, a member of the Polish resistance, who analysed the fuel used in the V2 rocket, the formula being subsequently sent to England.
- Henryk Magnuski, a Polish engineer working for Motorola, co-designed the SCR-300 radio in 1940. It was the first small radio receiver/transmitter to have manually set frequencies. It was used extensively by the American Army and was nicknamed the "walkie-talkie".

=== Weapons ===
Polish engineers who escaped German-occupied Poland contributed to weapon developments during the war. A Polish/Czech/British team brought the 20 mm Polsten to fruition as a simpler and cheaper to produce but as effective derivative of the Oerlikon 20 mm cannon.

The Polish Home Army was probably the only World War II resistance movement to manufacture large quantities of weaponry and munitions. In addition to production of pre-war designs they developed and produced in the war the Błyskawica submachine gun, Bechowiec, KIS and Polski Sten (from the British Sten) machine pistols as well as the filipinka and sidolówka hand grenades. In the Warsaw Uprising Polish engineers built several armoured cars, such as the Kubuś, which also took part in the fighting. The KIS was designed and made in the Jan Piwnik's "Ponury" ("Grim") guerrilla unit that was operating in Holy Cross Mountains region. It was probably the only kind of modern firearm that could be manufactured in the forest without the need for sophisticated tools and factory equipment in the Second World War.

== See also ==
- History of Poland (1939–1945)
- List of Polish armies in World War II
- List of Polish divisions in World War II
- Polish resistance movement in World War II
- Western betrayal

== Notes ==
a Numerous sources state that Polish Army was the fourth biggest Allied fighting contingent. Steven J. Zaloga wrote that "by the war's end the Polish Army was the fourth largest contingent of the Allied coalition after the armed forces of the Soviet Union, the United States and Great Britain." Jerzy Jan Lerski writes "All in all, the Polish units, although divided and controlled by different political orientation, constituted the fourth largest Allied force, after the American, British and Soviet Armies." M. K. Dziewanowski has noted that "if Polish forces fighting in the east and west were added to the resistance fighters, Poland had the fourth largest Allied army in the war (after the USSR, the U.S. and Britain)".

b Sources vary with regards to what was the largest resistance movement in World War II. As the war progressed, some resistance movements grew larger—and others diminished. Polish territories were mostly freed from Nazi German control in the years 1944–1945, eliminating the need for their respective (anti-Nazi) partisan forces in Poland (although the cursed soldiers continued to fight against the Soviets). Several sources note that Polish Armia Krajowa was the largest resistance movement in Nazi-occupied Europe. For example, Norman Davies wrote "Armia Krajowa (Home Army), the AK, which could fairly claim to be the largest of European resistance"; Gregor Dallas wrote "Home Army (Armia Krajowa or AK) in late 1943 numbered about 400,000, making it the largest resistance organization in Europe"; Mark Wyman wrote "Armia Krajowa was considered the largest underground resistance unit in wartime Europe". Certainly, Polish resistance was the largest resistance until the German invasion of Yugoslavia and the invasion of the Soviet Union in 1941. After that point, the numbers of Soviet partisans and Yugoslav partisans grew rapidly. The number of Soviet partisans quickly caught up and were very similar to that of the Polish resistance. The number of Tito's Yugoslav partisans were roughly similar to those of the Polish and Soviet partisans in the first years of the war (1941–1942), but grew rapidly in the latter years, outnumbering the Polish and Soviet partisans by 2:1 or more (estimates give Yugoslavian forces about 800,000 in 1945, to Polish and Soviet forces of 400,000 in 1944).

== Bibliography ==
- Władysław Anders: An Army in Exile: The Story of the Second Polish Corps, 1981, ISBN 978-0-89839-043-8.
- Władysław Anders: Mémoires (1939–1946), 1948, Paris, La Jeune Parque.
- Margaret Brodniewicz-Stawicki: For Your Freedom and Ours: The Polish Armed Forces in the Second World War, Vanwell Publishing, 1999, ISBN 978-1-55125-035-9.
- Tadeusz Bór-Komorowski: Secret Army, Battery Press, 1984, ISBN 978-0-89839-082-7.
- George F. Cholewczynski (1993). Poles Apart. Sarpedon Publishers. ISBN 978-1-85367-165-4.
- George F. Cholewczynski (1990). De Polen Van Driel. Uitgeverij Lunet. ISBN 978-90-71743-10-8.
- Jerzy B. Cynk: The Polish Air Force at War: The Official History, 1939–1943, Schiffer Publishing, 1998, ISBN 978-0-7643-0559-7.
- Jerzy B. Cynk: The Polish Air Force at War: The Official History, 1943–1945, Schiffer Publishing, 1998, ISBN 978-0-7643-0560-3.
- Norman Davies: Rising '44: The Battle for Warsaw, Viking Books, 2004, ISBN 978-0-670-03284-6.
- Norman Davies, God's Playground, Oxford University Press, 1981.
- Józef Garliński: Poland in the Second World War, Hippocrene Books, 1987, ISBN 978-0-87052-372-4.
- Robert Gretzyngier: Poles in Defence of Britain, London, 2001, ISBN 978-1-904943-05-1.
- F.H. Hinsley and Alan Stripp, eds., Codebreakers: The Inside Story of Bletchley Park, Oxford University Press, 1993.
- Jan Karski: Story of a Secret State, Simon Publications, 2001, ISBN 978-1-931541-39-8.
- Halik Kochanski: The Eagle Unbowed: Poland and the Poles in the Second World War, Harvard University Press, 2012, ISBN 978-0-674-06814-8.
- Jan Koniarek, Polish Air Force 1939–1945, Squadron/Signal Publications, 1994, ISBN 978-0-89747-324-8.
- Stefan Korboński, Zofia Korbońska, F. B. Czarnomski: Fighting Warsaw: the Story of the Polish Underground State, 1939–1945, Hippocrene Books, 2004, ISBN 978-0-7818-1035-7.
- Władysław Kozaczuk, Enigma: How the German Machine Cipher Was Broken, and How It Was Read by the Allies in World War Two, edited and translated by Christopher Kasparek, University Publications of America, 1984, ISBN 978-0-89093-547-7. (This remains the standard reference on the Polish part in the Enigma-decryption epic.)
- Władysław Kozaczuk, Jerzy Straszak: Enigma: How the Poles Broke the Nazi Code, Hippocrene Books; 2004, ISBN 978-0-7818-0941-2.
- Richard Lukas: Did the Children Cry? Hippocrene Books, 1994.
- Richard Lukas: Forgotten Holocaust. Hippocrene Books, 2nd rev.ed., 2005.
- Richard Lukas: Forgotten Survivors. Univ. Press of Kansas, 2004.
- Lynne Olson, Stanley Cloud: A Question of Honor: The Kosciuszko Squadron: Forgotten Heroes of World War II, Knopf, 2003, ISBN 978-0-375-41197-7.
- Michael Alfred Peszke, Battle for Warsaw, 1939–1944, East European Monographs, 1995, ISBN 978-0-88033-324-5.
- Michael Alfred Peszke, Poland's Navy, 1918–1945, Hippocrene Books, 1999, ISBN 978-0-7818-0672-5.
- Michael Alfred Peszke, The Polish Underground Army, the Western Allies, and the Failure of Strategic Unity in World War II, foreword by Piotr S. Wandycz, Jefferson, NC, McFarland & Company, 2005, ISBN 978-0-7864-2009-4. Google Print
- Polish Air Force Association: Destiny Can Wait: The Polish Air Force in the Second World War, Battery Press, 1988, ISBN 978-0-89839-113-8.
- Polish Troops in Norway, a photographic record of the campaign at Narvik, published for the Polish Ministry of Information by M.I.Kolin (Publishers) Ltd., London July 1943.
- Harvey Sarner: Anders and the Soldiers of the Second Polish Corps, Brunswick Press, 1998, ISBN 978-1-888521-13-9.
- Stanisław Sosabowski: Freely I Served, Battery Press Inc, 1982, ISBN 978-0-89839-061-2.
- Dr Marek Stella-Sawicki, Jarek Garlinski, and Stefan Mucha: First to Fight: Poland's Contribution to Allied Victory in World War II, 2009, ISBN 978-0-9557824-4-2.
- Gordon Welchman, The Hut Six Story: Breaking the Enigma Codes, New York, McGraw-Hill, 1982.
- Michał Wojewódzki, Akcja V-1, V-2 (Operation V-1, V-2), 3rd ed., rev., Warsaw, Pax, 1975.
- E. Thomas Wood, Stanislaw M. Jankowski: Karski: How One Man Tried to Stop the Holocaust, Wiley, 1996, ISBN 978-0-471-14573-8.
- Steven J. Zaloga: Poland 1939: The Birth of Blitzkrieg, Osprey Publishing, 2004, ISBN 978-1-84176-408-5.
- Steven J. Zaloga: The Polish Army 1939–1945, Osprey Publishing, 1982, ISBN 978-0-85045-417-8.
- Adam Zamoyski: The Forgotten Few: The Polish Air Force in the Second World War, Pen & Sword Books, 2004, ISBN 978-1-84415-090-8.
