= Józef Kosacki =

Polish inventor and engineer

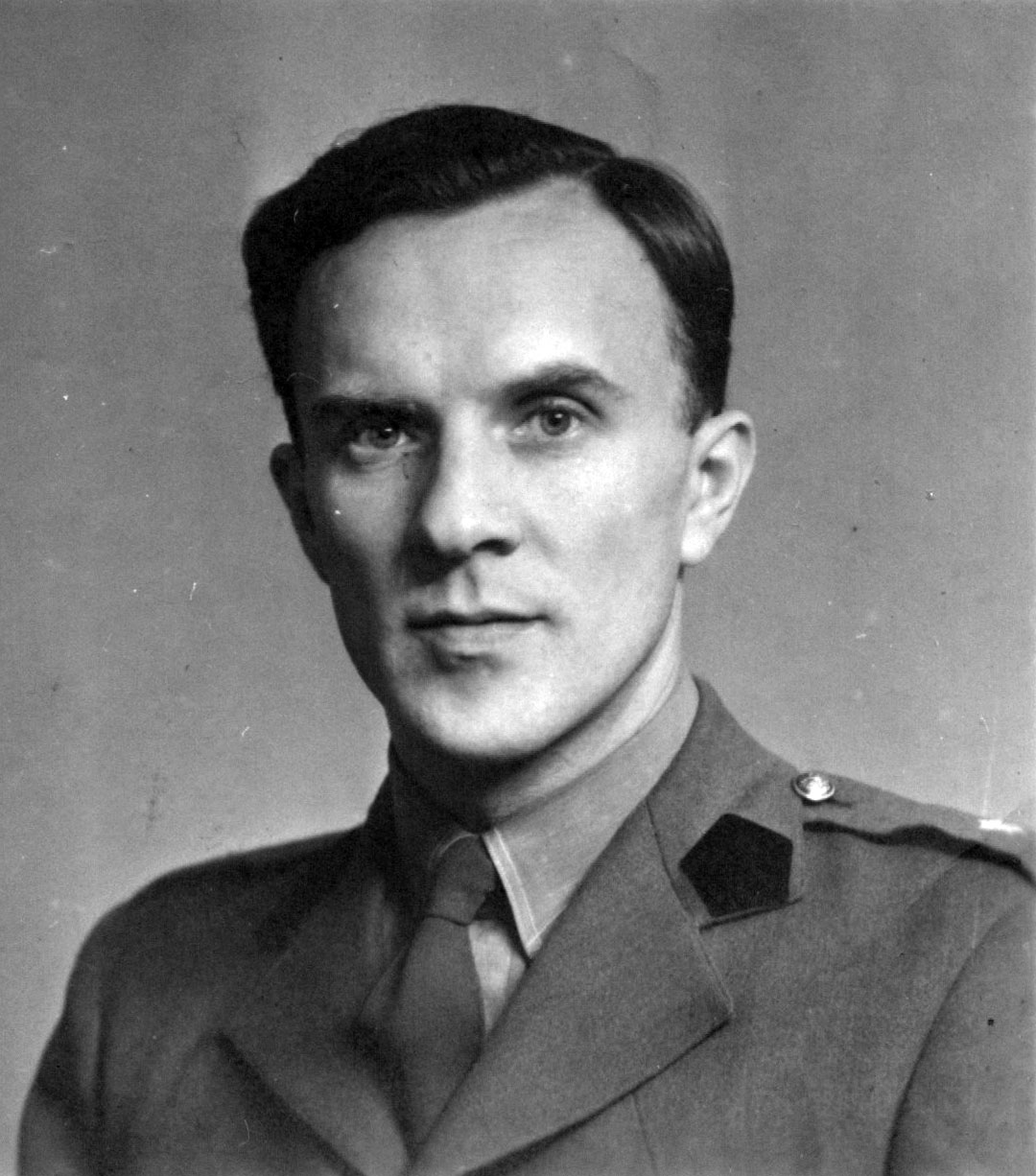
- Kosacki during the World War II
- Born: Józef Stanisław Kosacki; April 21, 1909; Łapy, Congress Poland, Russian Empire
- Died: April 26, 1990 (aged 81); Warsaw, Poland
- Education: Warsaw University of Technology
- Occupations: engineer, inventor, Lieutenant in the Polish Army
- Known for: Polish mine detector
- Awards: Officer's Cross of the Order of Polonia Restituta (Poland); Defence Medal (United Kingdom)

Józef Kosacki (Polish pronunciation: [ˈjuzɛf kɔˈsat͡ski]; born 21 April 1909 – died 26 April 1990) was a Polish professor, engineer, inventor, and an officer in the Polish Army during World War II. He is best known as the inventor of the Polish mine detector, the first portable mine detector, whose basic design has been in use with various armies for over 50 years.

== Life ==
Before World War II, Kosacki was a technician in the Artillery Department of the Polish Ministry of National Defense. Shortly before the war, he joined the clandestine Special Signals Unit, a secret institute that worked on electronic appliances for the army. Following the 1939 invasion of Poland, he managed to get to the United Kingdom, where he continued his service in the Polish Army as a signals officer. In 1941 he devised his Polish Mine Detector. It was to be used for the first time in action on Second Battle of El Alamein. Five hundred of these detectors were issued to Eighth Army. They doubled the speed at which heavily mined sands could be cleared, from 100 to 200 meters an hour. The device was used until the 1991 Gulf War.

After the war, he returned to Poland, where he became a pioneer of electronics and nuclear machinery. For many years he held the chair in electronics at the Institute for Nuclear Research at Otwock - Świerk. He was also a professor at the Military Technical Academy in Warsaw. He died in 1990 and was buried with military honors.

== Legacy ==
In 2005 the Wrocław-based Military Institute for Engineering Technology (WITI) was named for him. This Institute has the first prototype Polish mine detector built by Kosacki.

== Name ==
During World War II, Kosacki's name was classified in order to protect his family, which had remained behind in German-held Poland. Therefore, most of his patents were submitted under pseudonyms, including "Józef Kos," "Kozacki" and "Kozak." As a result, his surname is often given erroneously in postwar historiography.

== See also ==
- List of Polish engineers
- Timeline of Polish science and technology

== Bibliography ==
- Mike Croll, "The History of Landmines", first published in Great Britain in 1998 by Leo Cooper, an imprint of Pen & Sword Books Ltd, ISBN 0-85052-628-0
- Modelski Tadeusz (1986). "The Polish Contribution to The Ultimate Allied Victory in The Second World War" p. 221
- "Time Magazine"/Canadian Edition, March 8, 1999, page 18
- Mieczysław Borchólski "Z saperami generała Maczka", MON 1990, ISBN 83-11-07794-0
