= Polish mine detector =

WWII landmine detector

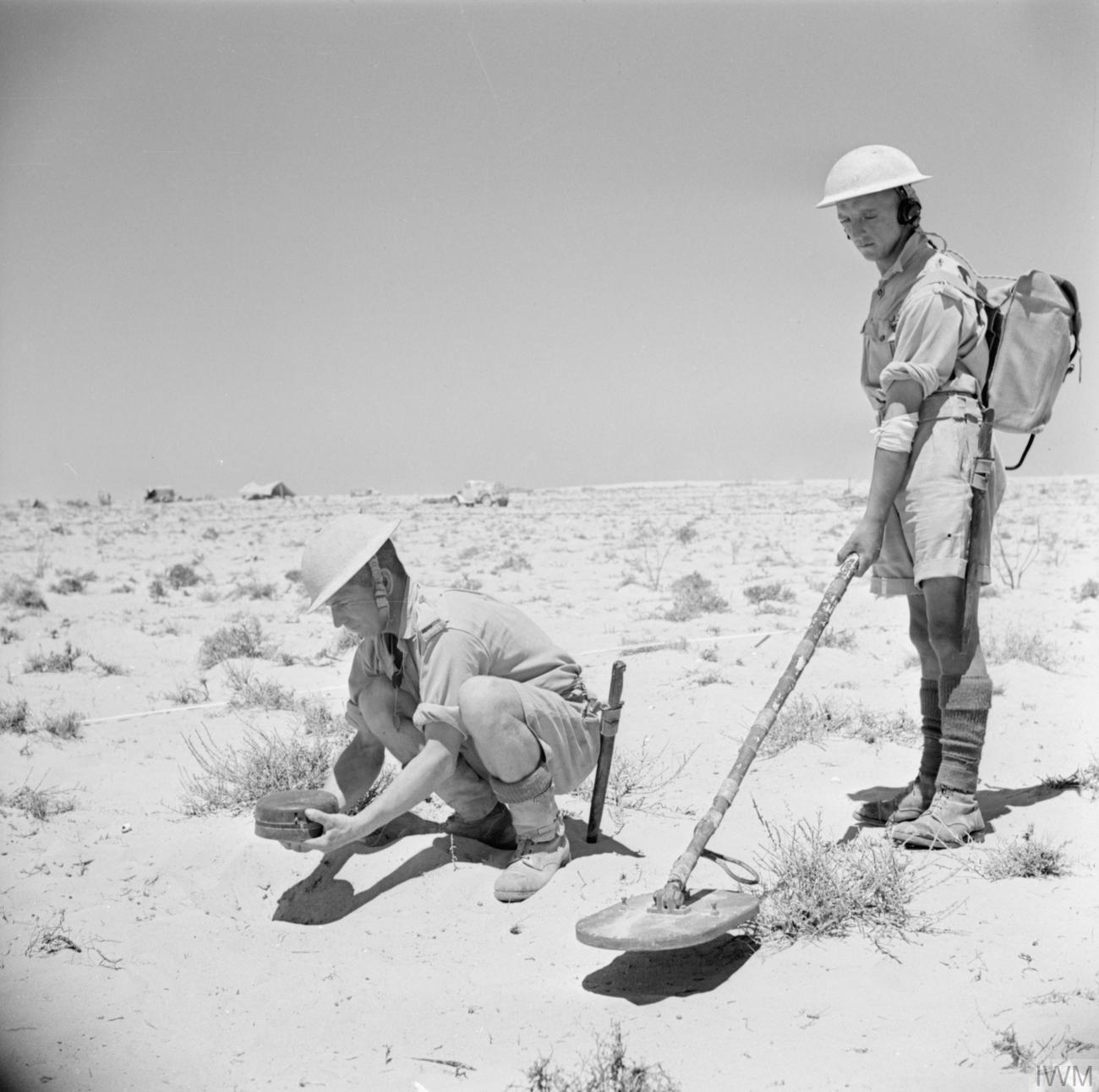
Two Royal Engineers sappers demonstrating the use of a Polish mine detector in North Africa, August 1942

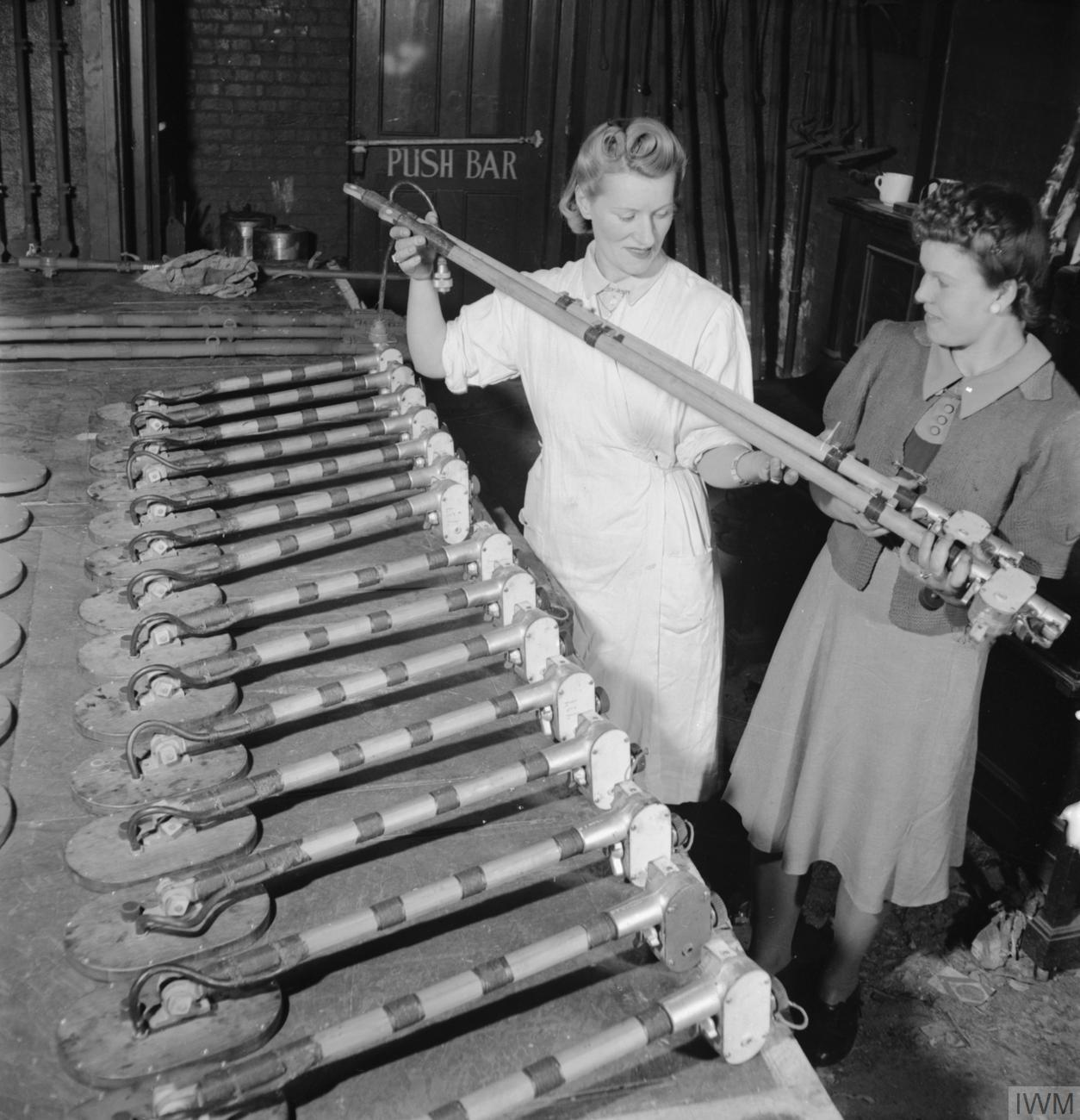
Polish mine detectors being assembled in Britain, 1943

The Mine detector (Polish) Mark I (Polish: wykrywacz min) was a metal detector for landmines developed during World War II. Initial work on the design had started in Poland but after the invasion of Poland by the Germans in 1939, and then the Fall of France in mid-1940, it was not until the winter of 1941–1942 that work was completed by Polish lieutenant Józef Kosacki.

== History ==
In the pre-war period, the Department of Artillery of Poland's Ministry of National Defence ordered the construction of a device that could be helpful in locating duds on artillery training grounds. The instrument was designed by the AVA Wytwórnia Radiotechniczna, but its implementation was prevented by the German invasion of Poland. Following the fall of Poland and the transfer of Polish HQ to France, work restarted on the device, this time intended as a mine detector. Little is known of this stage of construction as the work was stopped by the Battle of France and the need to evacuate the Polish personnel to Great Britain.

There in late 1941 Lieutenant Józef Kosacki devised a final version, based partially on the earlier designs. His invention was not patented; he gave it as a gift to the British Army. He was given a letter of thanks from the King for this act. His design was accepted and 500 mine detectors were immediately sent to El Alamein where they doubled the speed of the British Eighth Army. During the war more than 100,000 of this type were produced, together with several hundred thousands of further developments of the mine detector (Mk. II, Mk. III and Mk IV). The detector was used later during the Allied invasion of Sicily, the Allied invasion of Italy and the Invasion of Normandy. This type of detector was used by the British Army until 1995.

An attempt was made to mount a version of the mine detector on a vehicle so that sappers would be less vulnerable. To this end "Lulu" (on a Sherman tank) and subsequently "Bantu" (on a Staghound armoured car) were developed. The detector mechanism was in non-metallic rollers on arms held away from the vehicle. When the roller passed over a mine or a similar piece of metal it was indicated in the vehicle. Prototypes were built but never tried in combat.

== Design ==
The Polish detector had two coils, one of which was connected to an oscillator which generated an oscillating current of an acoustic frequency. The other coil was connected to an amplifier and a headphone. When the coils came into proximity to a metallic object the balance between the coils was upset and the headphone reported a signal. The equipment weighed just under 30 pounds [14 kilograms] and could be operated by one man. The Polish detector saw service throughout the war and the Mark 4c version was still used by the British Army until 1995.

— Mike Croll, The History of Landmines

== See also ==
- Demining
- Land mine
