= Cadix =

French World War II intelligence center

Coordinates: 44.0216°N 4.4341°E

Cadix was a World War II clandestine intelligence center at Uzès, in southern France, from September 1940 to 9 November 1942. During this period southern France was under the control of Vichy France and not occupied by Nazi Germany. At Cadix, the predominantly Polish team of cryptanalysts who had previously worked at PC Bruno was reassembled, and worked against German and other Axis ciphers, including the German Enigma machine cipher. Cadix shut down when Germany occupied southern France.

== History ==
After the German conquest of Poland in 1939, key personnel of the Polish Cipher Bureau escaped to France. Major Gustave Bertrand of French intelligence established PC Bruno, where the Poles worked, via teletype line, with British cryptologists at Bletchley Park to break Enigma.

During the German invasion of France, PC Bruno had to be evacuated. On 22 June 1940, France signed an armistice with Germany. Two days later, Major Bertrand flew the essential personnel of PC Bruno to French-controlled Algeria.

Bertrand remained an officer of the official French intelligence service, nominally controlled by "Vichy France", the quasi-collaborationist regime headed by Marshal Pétain. But Bertrand and the service retained substantial independence.

In September 1940, Bertrand secretly returned the PC Bruno staff to the unoccupied area of southern France. At the Château des Fouzes, near Uzès, they formed a new intelligence center codenamed Cadix. (Cadix was apparently derived from the French name for the Spanish city of Cádiz.) There they resumed work against Axis ciphers. The staff at Cadix comprised 15 Poles, 9 Frenchmen, and 7 Spaniards (the latter worked on Italian and Spanish ciphers).

Polish cryptologists (from left) Zygalski, Różycki, Rejewski at Cadix, between September 1940 and June 1941

One unusual task came in July 1941. The Polish Cipher Bureau chiefs asked Polish analysts Marian Rejewski and Henryk Zygalski to test the security of the Polish Lacida (or LCD) rotor cipher machine. The device had evidently never been subjected to rigorous testing before being approved for production and wartime use. To the consternation of the Cipher Bureau chiefs, the two mathematicians made short work of the Lacida.

Cadix had a branch office in Algeria, directed by Maksymilian Ciężki, which periodically exchanged staff with Uzès. When the passenger ship Lamoricière mysteriously sank on 9 January 1942, several Cadix staff sailing to France in one of these exchanges were lost. Those lost included Jerzy Różycki, one of the Cipher Bureau's three mathematician-cryptologists, Piotr Smoleński and Jan Graliński of the prewar Cipher Bureau's Russian section, and Captain François Lane, a French officer accompanying the three Poles.

On 8 November 1942, Allied forces landed in French North Africa. When the French authorities there submitted to the Allies and broke with Vichy France, Germany occupied southern France.

Major Bertrand, anticipating this outcome, evacuated Cadix on 9 November, two days before the German forces moved. The Cadix staff dispersed, attempting to reach Allied territory.

Rejewski and Zygalski eventually crossed into Spain, where they were arrested and imprisoned. Released after Red Cross intercessions, they went to Britain. There they were employed by the Government Code and Cypher School until the war's end, against German SS "hand" ciphers.

Cadix's Polish military chiefs, Gwido Langer and Maksymilian Ciężki, were captured by the Germans as they tried to cross from France into Spain on the night of 10–11 March 1943. Three other Poles were captured with them, Antoni Palluth, Edward Fokczyński, and Kazimierz Gaca. Langer and Ciężki became prisoners of war. The other three men were sent as slave labor to Germany, where Palluth and Fokczyński perished. All five men protected the secret of Allied decryption of the Enigma cipher.

== See also ==
- Cipher Bureau
- Saxon Palace
- Kabaty Woods
- PC Bruno
- Enigma cipher
- Ultra (cryptography)
- Jerzy Różycki

== Cadix staff photo ==
Polish-French-Spanish Cadix center. From left: 1. Henri Braquenié. 2. Piotr Smoleński. 3. Edward Fokczyński. 5. Maksymilian Ciężki. 7. Gwido Langer. 8. Mary Bertrand, wife of: 9. Gustave Bertrand. 13. Henryk Zygalski (in back, wearing glasses). 14. Jan Graliński. 18. Jerzy Różycki. 20. Marian Rejewski.
