= Leonard Danilewicz =

Leonard Stanisław Danilewicz was a Polish engineer and, for some ten years before the outbreak of World War II, one of the four directors of the AVA Radio Company in Warsaw, Poland.

== Cipher Bureau work ==
AVA designed and built radio equipment for the Polish General Staff's Cipher Bureau, which was responsible for the radio communications of the General Staff's Oddział II (Section II, the General Staff's intelligence section).

Beginning in 1933, after the Cipher Bureau's mathematician-cryptologist Marian Rejewski reconstructed the German military Enigma rotor cipher machine, AVA built Enigma "doubles" as well as all the electro-mechanical equipment subsequently designed at the Cipher Bureau to expedite routine breaking and reading of Enigma ciphers.

AVA's other directors were Edward Fokczyński, Antoni Palluth, and Leonard Danilewicz's elder brother, Ludomir Danilewicz. The company took its name from the combined radio callsigns of the Danilewicz brothers (TPAV) and Palluth (TPVA). When the company was being formed about 1929, the Danilewicz brothers were short-wave "hams" and students at the Warsaw Polytechnic.

Leonard Danilewicz early showed remarkable creativity as a radio designer, coming up with a concept for a frequency-hopping spread spectrum:

In 1929 we proposed to the General Staff a device of my design for secret radio telegraphy which fortunately did not win acceptance, as it was a truly barbaric idea consisting in constant changes of transmitter frequency. The commission did, however, see fit to grant me 5,000 złotych for executing a model and as encouragement to further work.

== See also ==
- AVA Radio Company
- Spread spectrum
- Frequency-hopping spread spectrum
- List of multiple discoveries
- Biuro Szyfrów (Cipher Bureau)
- Marian Rejewski
- Enigma machine
- Cryptanalysis of the Enigma
- Ultra (cryptography)
- Lacida
