= AVA Radio Company =

Polish electronics firm

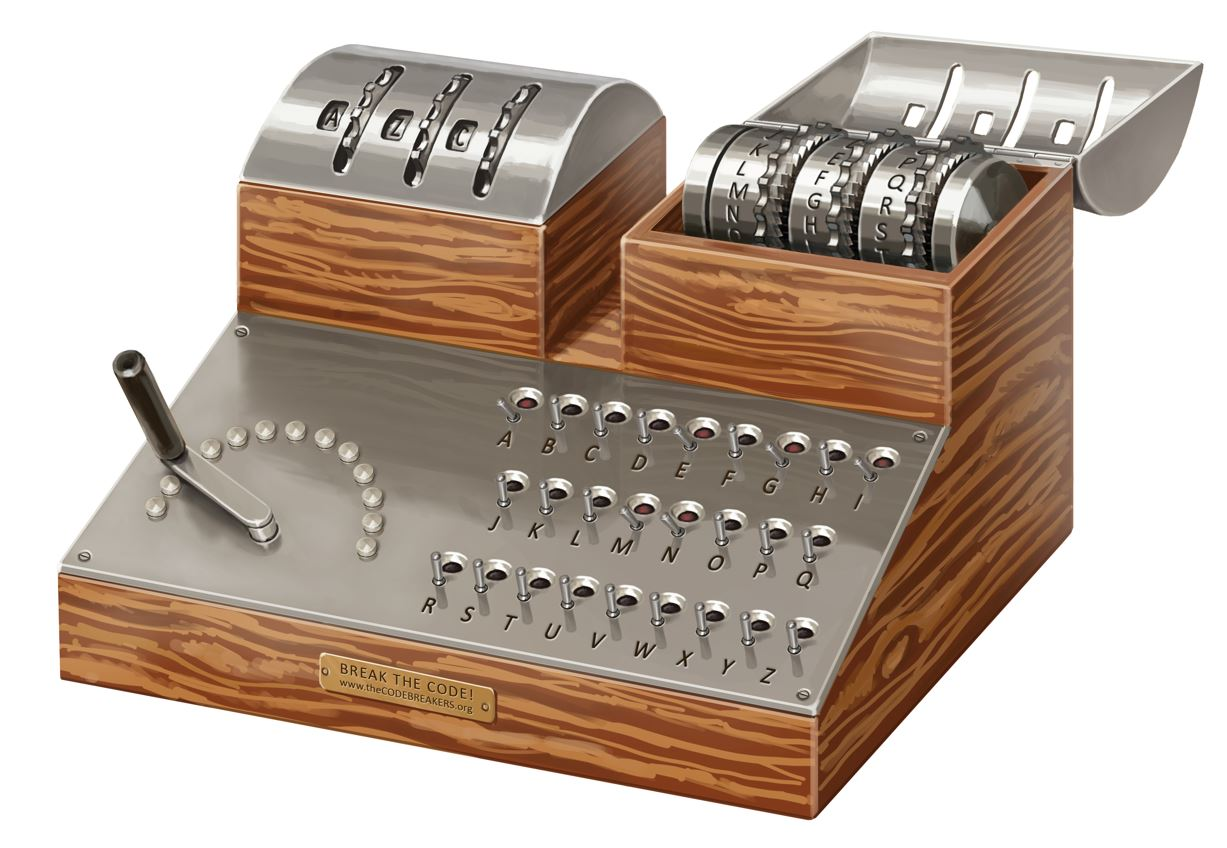
Reconstruction of the appearance of the Cyclometer on the basis of sketches from the memories of Marian Rejewski

The AVA Radio Company (Polish: Wytwórnia Radiotechniczna AVA) was a Polish electronics firm founded in 1929 in Warsaw, Poland. AVA designed and built radio equipment for the Polish General Staff's Cipher Bureau, which was responsible for the radio communications of the General Staff's Oddział II (Section II, the General Staff's intelligence section).

After the Cipher Bureau's mathematician-cryptologist Marian Rejewski in late December 1932 deduced the wiring in the German military Enigma rotor cipher machine, AVA built Enigma "doubles" as well as all the electro-mechanical equipment designed at the Cipher Bureau to expedite decryption of Enigma ciphers.

== History ==
AVA's four directors were Edward Fokczyński, Antoni Palluth, Ludomir Danilewicz, and his younger brother Leonard Danilewicz. The company took its name from the combined radio callsigns of the Danilewicz brothers: (TPAV later SP3AV) and Palluth (TPVA). SP3AV was named in 1930 as an amateur who worked on the 28 Megacycle band When the company was being formed in 1929, the Danilewicz brothers were short-wave "hams" and students at the Warsaw Polytechnic.

In 1927, Fokczyński had opened a small radio workshop on Warsaw's New World Street. Sporadically he had received orders from the Cipher Bureau, whose Captain Maksymilian Ciężki knew Fokczyński from his 1919–22 army service. Beginning in 1929, the modest shop, ten minutes' walk from the General Staff building, which housed the Cipher Bureau, was transformed into AVA. The company subsequently moved to new facilities in southern Warsaw's Mokotów district.

Early on, the fledgling company was severely under-capitalized. All four directors, however, had other jobs; and soon the Cipher Bureau came to the rescue with an order for eight 10-watt short-wave radio stations, which became the embryo of Section II's radio network. AVA also won other clients, including the Polish Navy and Professor Lugeon of the Warsaw Meteoroglogical Institute, for whom AVA built, to his design, an atmoradiograf that registered disturbances in the atmosphere; this, Leonard Danilewicz later recalled, was the unheralded beginning of radioastronomy.

The General Staff's Cipher Bureau was responsible for the radio communications of the General Staff's Section II (Intelligence section). The Cipher Bureau entrusted the design and construction of the equipment to AVA. The work was carried out on a cost-plus basis, to the benefit of both AVA and the General Staff.

In December 1932, the Cipher Bureau's mathematician-cryptologist Marian Rejewski reconstructed the wiring of the German Enigma machine. The Poles' subsequent reading of German ciphers laid the foundation for the western Allies' Ultra cipher-breaking operations, beginning seven years later, during World War II. Now, in January 1933, just as Hitler was coming to power in Germany, AVA quickly produced a "double" of the Enigma machine; by mid-1934, it had made over a dozen.

In 1934 or 1935, AVA built the cyclometer, a device designed by Rejewski to prepare a "card catalog" that facilitated the decryption of Enigma messages. In 1938 AVA built the "cryptologic bomb," invented by Rejewski about October 1938. This was an electrically powered aggregate of six Enigmas that took the place of some one hundred workers. Six bombs were built before September 1939.

Actual assembly of the cyclometers, "bombs" and Lacida cipher machines was carried out not at the AVA facilities but in Room 13 (the "Clock Room") at the Cipher Bureau in the General Staff building—and, from 1937, at the new Cipher Bureau center in the Kabaty Woods south of Warsaw. No one had access to this room except the head of the Cipher Bureau, Gwido Langer, the head of its German section (B.S. 4), Maksymilian Ciężki, and personnel employed there: Antoni Palluth, Ludomir Danilewicz, his younger brother Leonard, Edward Fokczyński, and the specialist in precision mechanics, Czesław Betlewski.

In July 1941, Marian Rejewski and Henryk Zygalski were asked to test the security of the Lacida at the Cadiz Center, near Uzès (free zone). The device had apparently not been rigorously tested before approval, because the two mathematicians decrypted a message in less than two hours. Their dismayed boss gave up using the machine.

== See also ==
- Biuro Szyfrów (Cipher Bureau)
- Cryptanalysis of the Enigma
