= Ludomir Danilewicz =

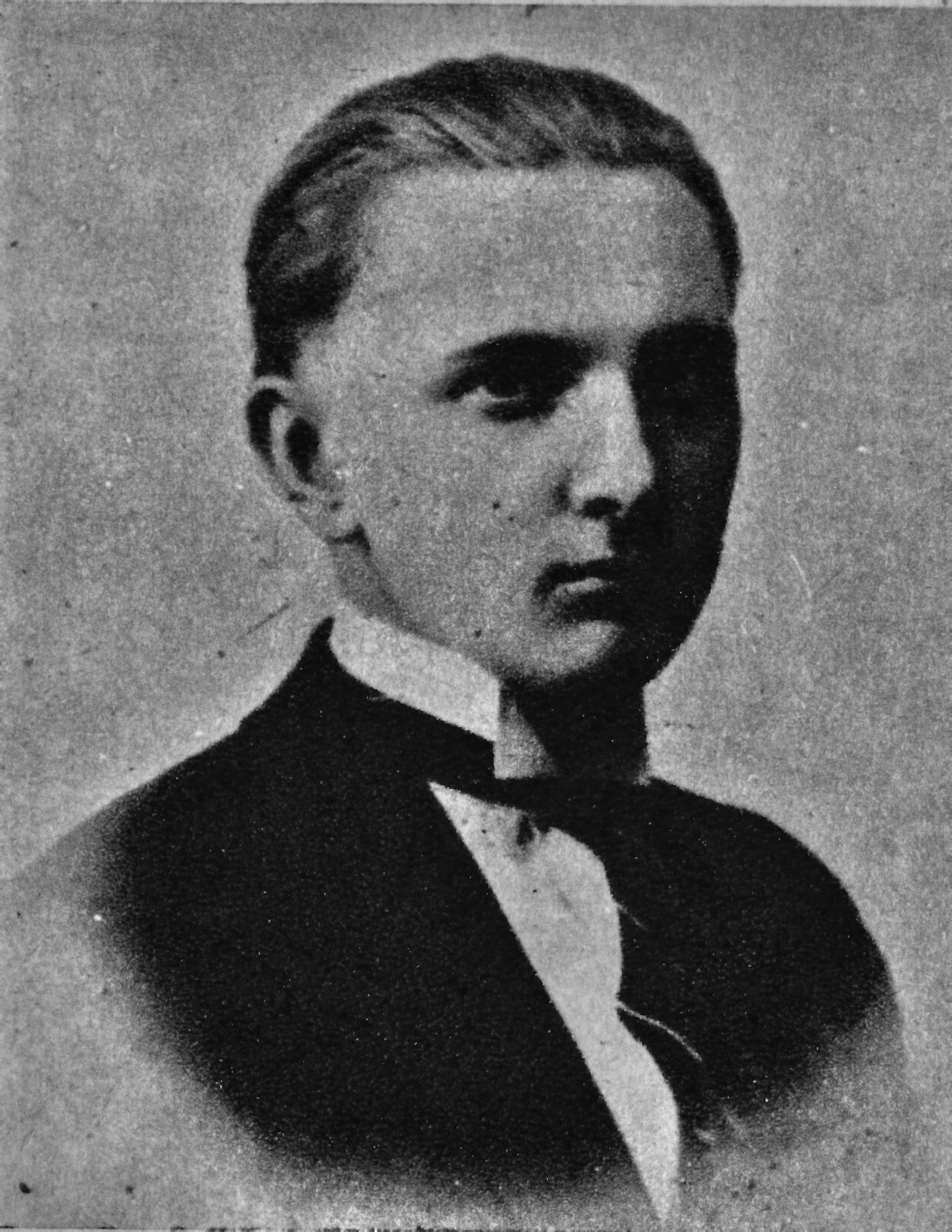
- Born: 1905
- Died: 1960 (aged 54–55)
- Occupations: inventor and engineer

Ludomir Danilewicz (1905–1960) was a Polish engineer and, for some ten years before the outbreak of World War II, one of the four directors of the AVA Radio Company in Warsaw, Poland. AVA designed and built radio equipment for the Polish General Staff's Cipher Bureau, which was responsible for the radio communications of the General Staff's Oddział II (Section II, the General Staff's intelligence section).

Beginning in 1933, after the Cipher Bureau's mathematician-cryptologist Marian Rejewski reconstructed the German military Enigma rotor cipher machine, AVA built Enigma "doubles" as well as all the electro-mechanical equipment subsequently designed at the Cipher Bureau to expedite routine breaking and reading of Enigma ciphers.

AVA's other directors were Edward Fokczyński, Antoni Palluth, and Ludomir Danilewicz's younger brother, Leonard Danilewicz. The company took its name from the combined radio callsigns of the Danilewicz brothers (TPAV) and Palluth (TPVA). When the company was being formed about 1929, the Danilewicz brothers were short-wave "hams" and students at the Warsaw Polytechnic.

== See also ==
- AVA Radio Company
- Biuro Szyfrów (Cipher Bureau)
- Marian Rejewski
- Enigma machine
- Cryptanalysis of the Enigma
- Ultra (cryptography)
- Lacida
