= Ludomir =

- Gender: male

Origin
- Origin: Slavic
- Meaning: lud ("people") + mir ("peace, world, prestige")

Other names
- Alternative spelling: Ludomír, Ljudomir
- Variant forms: Ludomira (f), Ljudemira (f), Ludomíra(f)
- Related names: Ludomił, Ludosław

Ludomir (Polish: Ludomir, Czech: Ludomír, South Slavic: Ljudomir) - is a Slavic given name consists of two words: "Lud" - people and "mir" - peace, glory, prestige. Feminine forms: Ludomira, Ljudomira, Ludomíra. May refer to:

- Ludomir Benedyktowicz, a Polish painter
- Ludomir Chronowski, Polish fencer
- Ludomir Danilewicz, a Polish engineer and, for some ten years before the outbreak of World War II, one of the four directors of the AVA Radio Company in Warsaw, Poland
- Ludomir Goździkiewicz, Polish politician
- Ludomir Różycki, a Polish composer and conductor
