= Kazimierz Gaca =

Polish-French cryptanalyst and intelligence officer.(1920-1997)

- Kazimierz Gaca
- Born: 1920; Bydgoszcz, Poland
- Died: 1997 or 2009; Place unknown
- Occupations: Cryptanalyst and intelligence officer
- Known for: Enigma machine deciphering
- Awards

Kazimierz Gaca alias Jean Jacquin (1920-1997) was a Polish cryptanalyst and officer. Before World War II, he worked at the Cipher Bureau (Biuro Szyfrów (BS)), decoding radio messages encrypted by the German military using their Enigma machine. After WWII, he worked for the French intelligence bureau and retired in the south of France.

== Biography ==
=== Early life, activities before WWII ===
Kazimierz was born from Aleksandra and Franciszek Gaca. He was the youngest of four brothers, Zbigniew (1908-1951), Czesław (born 1909) and Adam (born 1910). In Bydgoszcz, the family lived at 26 Chrobrego Street.

In 1938, while studying mathematics at the University of Warsaw, followed his twelve-years-older brother Zbigniew and joined the Polish Cipher Bureau or Biuro Szyfrów (BS). He was posted in the BS4, the department in charge of German ciphers, counterintelligence and radio surveillance. At the time, Kazimierz was the youngest employee, working in premises in the Kabaty Woods near Pyry (today's Polish Air Operations Center).

=== Second World War ===
Following the German invasion of Poland in September 1939, Kazimierz, like all BS employees, had to leave his country. Carrying a replica of the Enigma machine, it took five months for him to transfer to Romania then Yugoslavia and Greece. In Piraeus, Gaca could board the ship "Warszawa" and reach Marseille on 20 February 1940.

Many of his colleagues like himself gathered in a new base at the Château de Vignolles near Gretz-Armainvilliers, 30 kilometres (19 mi) southeast Paris. The place housed a secret intelligence allied facility, PC Bruno, led by major Gustave Bertrand: there, Kazimierz joined the "Z" Team in May 1940 and resumed the cryptanalytical fight to crack Enigma machine. Following the German offensive against France in June 1940, the team of Gustave Bertrand initially fled to French Algeria to escape the advancing Wehrmacht. Soon a new clandestine location managed by Bertrand was settled: code-named Cadix, it was located near Uzès, then in the free southern zone of France (Zone libre). Kazimierz (who took the alias of Jean Jacquin, born in La Roche sur Yon) and his colleagues moved back there.

In November 1942, German forces eventually occupied the Zone Libre (Operation Anton). Gaca, together with several colleagues (Edward Fokczyński, Gwido Langer, Antoni Palluth and Maksymilian Ciężki), were captured in the Pyrenees in March 1943, while attempting to escape from the Vichy regime to neighboring Spain. They were imprisoned in the citadel in Perpignan then transferred to Royallieu-Compiègne internment camp.

His friends had various and tragic fortunes:

- Lieutenant-colonel Gwido Langer, liberated in mid-1945 from the Schloss Jezeří near the Flossenbürg concentration camp, was sent to a Polish signals camp in Kinross, Scotland. Colonel Gano, the chief of the Polish Section II in Britain had been convinced that the failure of their evacuation to Spain was due to Langer's hesitation and lack of nerve. Gwido Langer died in Scotland on 30 March 1948;
- Major Maksymilian Ciężki was also interned at the Schloss Jezeří and sent after liberation to Kinross. He died in United Kingdom on 9 November 1951, after living the last three years on subsidies from the National Assistance Board;
- Major Edward Fokczyński died of starvation in the Sachsenhausen concentration camp in 1944;
- Antoni Palluth and Gaca were forced to work in the Heinkel aircraft factory in Oranienburg. The plant was partially destroyed by an Allied bombing raid on 18 April 1944: a bomb fragment fatally wounded Antoni, while Kazimierz Gaca, standing fifty meters away, survived.

=== Activities post WWII ===
After the war, Gustave Bertrand now Brigadier General, invited in 1947 Gaca and Sylwester Palluth, a cousin of Antoni Palluth, to join the French intelligence department he was leading.

On 07 June 1950, Kazimierz married Monique Isambert, the daughter of the general's chauffeur. The ceremony was also attended by his brother Zbigniew, just back from United Kingdom. The couple settled in the South of France, they had one daughter.

He outlived all his friends and colleagues from the BS and was able to witness the fall of communism in his homeland of Poland in 1989, where he never returned to.

Kazilierz Gaca wrote his memoirs in the mid-1980s and died in France in 1997.

The Polish endeavour for breaking of German Enigma ciphers had been kept secret for almost 30 years after the end of WWII: it only became public in the first half of the 1970s. One of the first to break this silence was Gustave Bertrand, then retired, who published a book entitled Enigma ou la plus grande énigme de la Guerre 1939 - 1945 (Enigma, or the Greatest Secret of the War of 1939-1945).

== Family ==
Bérénice Courtin (born in 1994) from Paris, is a granddaughter of Kazimierz Gaca. As a multidisciplinary artist and artisan based in Geneva, she weaves fabrics inspired by secret messages. Hiding codes in her textiles, she puts in parallel the weaving loom and the Enigma machine, both of which are the origin of the computer and binary code. She has also collaborated with other artists to create an experimental cinema performance about Gaca's work.

== Orders ==
For his services, Kazimierz Gaca was made knight in the French order of the Legion of Honour.

== See also ==
- Bydgoszcz
- Enigma machine
- Cadix
- Marian Rejewski
- List of Polish people

== Bibliography ==
- Sowińska, Hanka (2019). Bracia Gacowie. Tajemnica szyfrem pisana. Kalendarz Bydgoski [The Gaca Brothers. A Secret Written in Code] (PDF) (in Polish). Bydgoszcz: Towarzystwo Miłośników Miasta Bydgoszczy. pp. 68–73.
- Turing, Dermot (2018). X,Y&Z – The Real Story of how Enigma was Broken. Cheltenham: The History Press. ISBN 978-0-7509-8782-0.
