= Lacida =

Polish rotor cipher machine

- Invented by: Poland's Cipher Bureau
- Introduced: Before World War II
- Type: Rotor cipher machine

The Lacida, also called LCD, was a Polish rotor cipher machine. It was designed and produced before World War II by Poland's Cipher Bureau for prospective wartime use by Polish military higher commands. Lacida was also known as Crypto Machine during a TNMOC Virtual Talk.

== History ==
The machine's name derived from the surname initials of Gwido Langer, Maksymilian Ciężki and Ludomir Danilewicz and / or his younger brother, Leonard Danilewicz. It was built in Warsaw, to the Cipher Bureau's specifications, by the AVA Radio Company.

In anticipation of war, before the September 1939 invasion of Poland, two LCDs were sent to France. From spring 1941, an LCD was used by the Polish Team Z at the Polish-, Spanish- and French-manned Cadix radio-intelligence and decryption center at Uzès, near France's Mediterranean coast.

Prior to the machine's production, it had never been subjected to rigorous decryption attempts. Now it was decided to remedy this oversight. In early July 1941, Polish cryptologists Marian Rejewski and Henryk Zygalski received LCD-enciphered messages that had earlier been transmitted to the staff of the Polish Commander-in-Chief, based in London. Breaking the first message, given to the two cryptologists on July 3, took them only a couple of hours. Further tests yielded similar results. Colonel Langer suspended the use of LCD at Cadix.

In 1974, Rejewski explained that the LCD had two serious flaws. It lacked a commutator ("plugboard"), which was one of the strong points of the German military Enigma machine. The LCD's other weakness involved the reflector and wiring. These shortcomings did not imply that the LCD, somewhat larger than the Enigma and more complicated (e.g., it had a switch for resetting to deciphering), was easy to solve. Indeed, the likelihood of its being broken by the German E-Dienst was judged slight. Theoretically it did exist, however.

== See also ==
- Biuro Szyfrów (Cipher Bureau)
