= Jan Graliński =

Polish cryptologist (1895–1942)

Jan Józef Graliński (February 8, 1895 – January 9, 1942) was chief of the Polish General Staff's interbellum Cipher Bureau's Russian section, B.S.-3.

After Poland was overrun by the Germans and Soviets in September 1939, Graliński managed, along with other Cipher Bureau personnel, to reach Paris, France. He became part of the reconstituted Polish cryptologic unit that was housed during the "Phony War" in the Château de Vignolles, codenamed PC Bruno, at Gretz-Armainvilliers, some forty kilometers northeast of Paris.

After northern France was overrun by German forces in May–June 1940, Graliński was one of the Polish cryptologic team that operated at Cadix in southern, Vichy France's "Free Zone."

Graliński perished in the Mediterranean Sea, near the Balearic Islands, on January 9, 1942. He was returning to the Cadix center, near Uzès in southern France, from a stint at Cadix's branch office at the Château Couba on the outskirts of Algiers. His passenger ship, the SS Lamoricière, sank in unclear circumstances. Fellow victims of the disaster, among the 222 passengers lost, included Piotr Smoleński, likewise of the prewar Cipher Bureau's Russian section, and Jerzy Różycki of its German section, as well as a French officer accompanying the three Poles, Capt. François Lane.

In 1978 cryptologist Marian Rejewski, of the prewar Cipher Bureau's German section (B.S.-4), was asked by historian Richard Woytak whether he had known Capt. (eventually Major) Graliński. Rejewski replied that he had but that, for reasons of security, they had never discussed their respective cryptologic work. Rejewski added that Graliński "was supposed to have been very talented."

== See also ==
- History of Polish intelligence services
