= Zdzisław Krygowski =

Polish mathematician

Zdzislaw Krygowski.

Zdzisław Jan Ewangelii Antoni Krygowski (Lwów, 1872 — 1955, Poznań) was a Polish mathematician, rector of the Lwów Polytechnic (1917–18), and professor at Poznań University (1919–38, 1946–55).

== Enigma ==
Krygowski has become famous in the history of cryptology for having assisted the Polish General Staff in setting up its cryptology course for Poznań University mathematics students that began on 15 January 1929. This led eventually to the General Staff's Cipher Bureau's recruitment of Marian Rejewski, Henryk Zygalski and Jerzy Różycki, who would jointly break and decrypt the World War II-era German Enigma-machine ciphers, beginning at the end of December 1932.

== Family ==
Zdzisław Krygowski had three brothers - Tadeusz, Kazimierz and Stanisław. He married Rose New from England. They had one daughter Eileen Krygowska-Korczyńska, who after World War II worked for Jan Nowak-Jeziorański at RFE.

== See also ==
- List of Poles
