= Piotr Smoleński =

Polish cryptographer

Piotr Smoleński (died 9 January 1942) was a cryptologist in the Russian section (B.S.-3) of the interbellum Polish General Staff's Cipher Bureau.

With other cryptologists, including Jan Graliński, he died in the sinking of the passenger ship SS Lamoricière in the Mediterranean Sea.
