= SS Lamoricière =

French 20th century passenger ship that sank during WW2

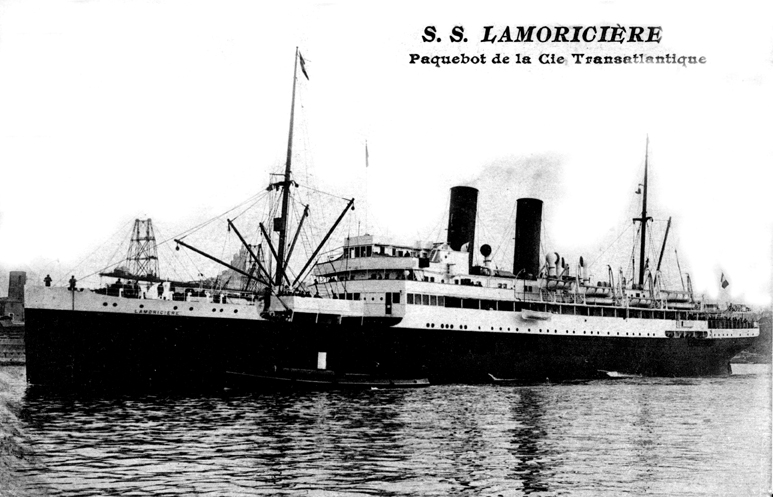
- CGT's Lamoricière

History

France
- Name: Lamoricière
- Namesake: Louis Juchault de Lamoricière
- Owner: Compagnie Générale Transatlantique
- Route: Mediterranean
- Builder: Swan Hunter, Wallsend
- Yard number: 1106
- Launched: 20 May 1920
- Completed: Jan 1921
- Home port: Marseille, France
- Fate: Sank on 9 January 1942

General characteristics
- Type: Steamship
- Tonnage: 4,713 GRT
- Length: 370 ft (110 m)
- Beam: 50 ft (15 m)
- Installed power: 2 x Steam turbines, SR geared plus T4cyl (31, 48, 53 & 53 x 45ins)
- Propulsion: 3 screws
- Speed: 17 knots (modified to 10 knots with coal burning)

SS Lamoricière was a French passenger liner operated by the Compagnie Générale Transatlantique. It was named after the French General Louis Juchault de Lamoricière.

== Ship ==
The ship had been built in the Newcastle yards of Swan Hunter in 1920 as an oil-burning steamship. However, in 1940, due to war conditions, the ship was altered to coal burning which reduced its speed dramatically from 17 knots (31 km/h; 20 mph) to only 10 knots (19 km/h; 12 mph). The cabin configuration at launch was six deluxe suites, 106 first class berths, 116 second class berths and 132 third class berths with the proposed route being Algiers-Marseille. There was hold capacity of 2,100 cubic metres (74,000 cu ft).

== Final voyage ==
On its final voyage the ship was captained by Captain Joseph Milliasseau (born in 1893), who had joined the service of the company in 1922. He had captained the ship since 1937 and had been crew on the ship since 1929. For his services in the First World War he had been made a chevalier de la Légion d'honneur in 1921.

== Sinking ==
Lamoricière sank on 9 January 1942 during a severe storm while en route from Algiers to Marseille, whence it had sailed at 17.00 hours on 6 January 1942. The ship was carrying 272 passengers (of which 88 were military personnel) and 122 crew members, and a cargo of 330 tonnes, principally of vegetables, on its final voyage.

Lamoricière sank in unclear circumstances near the Balearic Islands. The ship had gone to the rescue of a French freighter in distress, Jumiège, but by the time it arrived the freighter had sunk with the loss of its 20 crew. Around midday on 8 January the ship passed between the two principal Balearic Islands and started heading towards Marseilles.

The increasing savage storm, with winds at Force 7 on the Beaufort scale, was complicated further by Lamoricière running low on coal (which was also of poor quality). The stokers were burning furniture to augment the little fuel that remained. This meant that the ship was without the ability to reach port on the nearest land, which was Menorca. Eventually the ship developed a list, water started entering via the portholes, flooding the engine rooms (at 18.00 hours) and immobilising the generators and pumps (21.00 hours). Attempts were made to shift the deck-cargo to rebalance the ship but this failed.

At 11 am the order to abandon ship was given, but due to the list of the ship, the starboard lifeboats could not be launched. One of the first boats to be launched was snagged and its occupants were thrown into the sea. In this boat were also 16 children from Centre Guynemer and two Red Cross nurses. Of these only two children were saved.

At 12.35, the ship sank at 40°00′N 04°22′E. The few survivors were picked up by two liners Gouverneur général Gueydon (55 survivors) and Gouverneur général Chanzy (25 survivors) and the french military ship Impétueuse (12 survivors).

The victims of the disaster (there were 212 passenger and 80 crew fatalities, and only 93 survivors) included three Polish cryptologists of the prewar Polish Cipher Bureau – Jerzy Różycki (of the Bureau's German section), and Piotr Smoleński and Captain Jan Graliński (of the Bureau's Russian section) – and a French officer accompanying the three Poles, Captain François Lane.

Captain Milliasseau went down with the ship.

A subsequent lawsuit in the 1950s established that the sinking was four fifths due to the storm and one fifth due to the unseaworthiness of the ship. This apportioning of blame, and hence damages, is called the Lamoricière Principle.

The remains of Lamoricière were found, in 2008, at a depth of 156 metres (512 ft) some 10 kilometres (6.2 mi) northeast of Menorca by a team of Spanish and Italian divers.
