= Antoni Palluth =

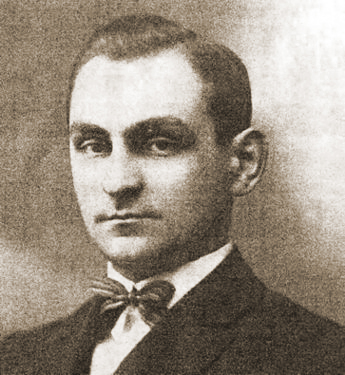
- Born: May 11, 1900
- Died: April 18, 1944 (aged 43)
- Occupation: Founder of the AVA Radio Company.

Antoni Palluth (11 May 1900, Pobiedziska, Province of Posen – 18 April 1944) was a founder of the AVA Radio Company. The company built communications equipment for the Polish military; the work included not only radios but also cryptographic equipment.

Palluth was involved with the German section (BS-4) of the Polish General Staff's interbellum Cipher Bureau. He helped teach courses on cryptanalysis, and was involved with building equipment to break the German Enigma machine.

== Life ==
Palluth was a civil-engineer graduate of the Warsaw Polytechnic. In January 1929, he was one of the instructors in a cryptology course organized by the Cipher Bureau, at Poznań University, which was attended by selected mathematics students. The students included future Cipher Bureau civilian employees Marian Rejewski, Jerzy Różycki and Henryk Zygalski.

In the 1930s, Palluth was one of the four directors of the AVA Radio Company in Warsaw, which produced cryptologic equipment designed by the Cipher Bureau.

In March 1943, while attempting to cross the border from German-occupied France into Spain, Palluth was captured by the Germans along with the Cipher Bureau's chief, Lt. Col. Gwido Langer, its German section's chief, Major Maksymilian Ciężki, and civilians Edward Fokczyński and Kazimierz Gaca.

Palluth died during an Allied air raid at the German Sachsenhausen concentration camp.

== See also ==
- Biuro Szyfrów (Cipher Bureau)
- Marian Rejewski
- Enigma machine
- Cryptanalysis of the Enigma
- Ultra (cryptography)
