= Maksymilian Ciężki =

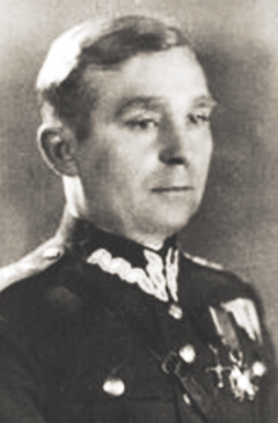
Maksymilian Ciężki

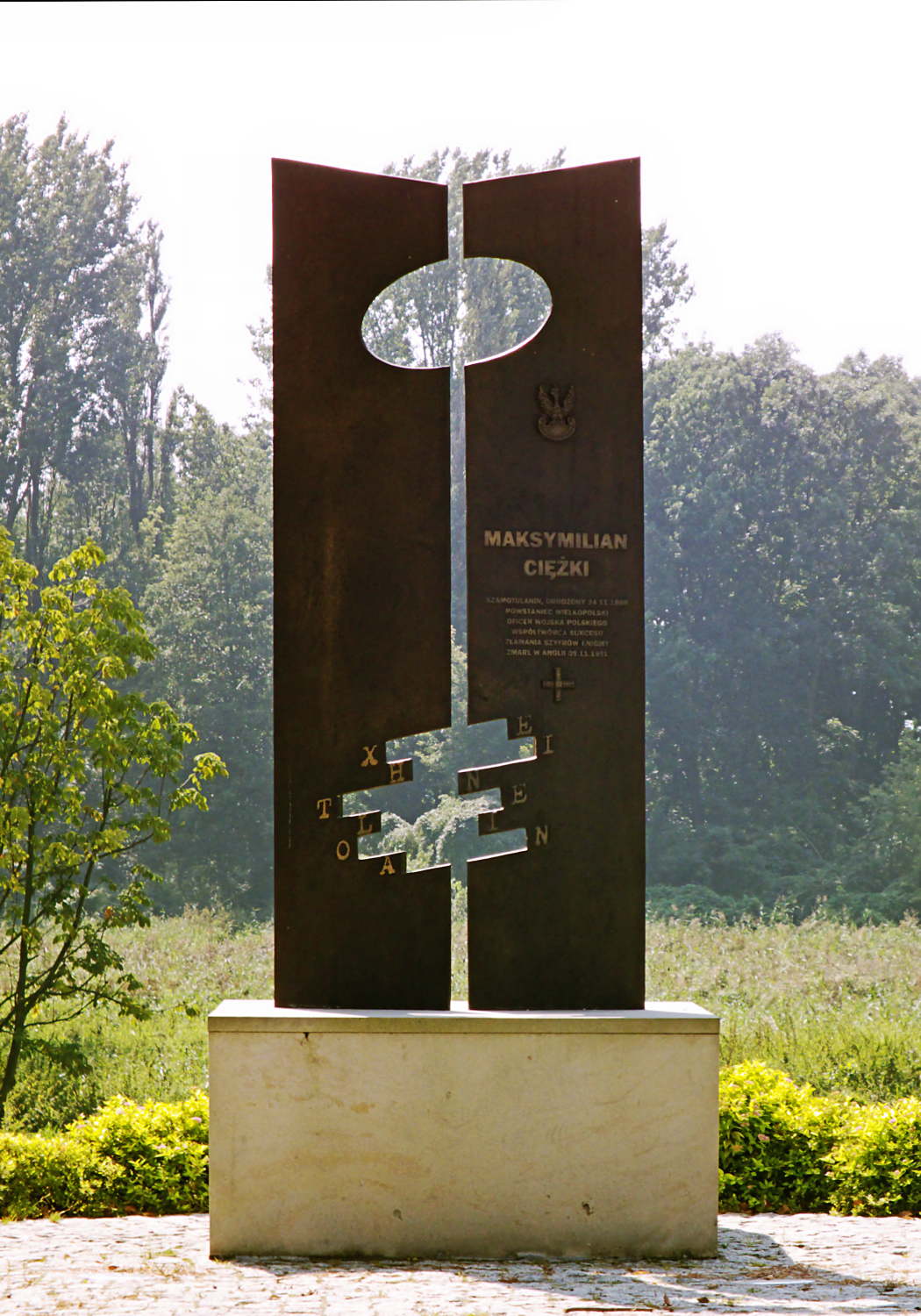
Maksymilian Ciężki Monument, ulica Dworcowa (Railroad Station Street), Szamotuły (Ciężki's home town), Poland

Maksymilian Ciężki ([maksɨˈmiljan ˈt͡ɕjɛ̃ʂki]; Samter, Province of Posen (now Szamotuły, Poland), 24 November 1898 – 9 November 1951 in London, England) was the head of the Polish Cipher Bureau's German section (BS–4) in the 1930s, during which time—from December 1932—the Bureau decrypted German Enigma messages.

During the German invasion of Poland in September 1939, Ciężki escaped to France to continue work on breaking Enigma ciphers. In 1943 he was captured by the Germans and interned in an S.S. concentration camp.

== Career ==
In the 1930s, Ciężki, as an army captain, was chief of the Polish General Staff Cipher Bureau's German section (Biuro Szyfrów-4, abbreviated BS-4). This section "broke" (decrypted) German Enigma machine ciphers. Ciężki was also deputy to the Cipher Bureau's chief, Major (later, Lt. Col.) Gwido Langer, and in addition supervised the radio-intercept stations at Starogard in the Polish Corridor, at Poznań in western Poland, and at Krzesławice, near Kraków in southern Poland.

In March 1943, now-Major Ciężki, Lt. Col. Langer, Lt. Antoni Palluth and civilians Edward Fokczyński and Kazimierz Gaca were betrayed by their French guide and captured by the Germans as they attempted to cross from German-occupied France into Spain.

Ciężki and Langer were sent to an SS concentration camp where, during interrogations, they managed to protect the secret of Enigma decryption. They convinced their interrogators that, while the Poles had had some success with solving the Enigma early on, changes introduced by the Germans just before the start of the war had prevented any further decryption.

Palluth, Fokczyński and Gaca — according to Col. Stefan Mayer, prewar chief of the intelligence department in Section II of the Polish General Staff — likewise "were acquainted to the last detail with the... breaking [of] Enigma. They were kept by [the] Germans in most awful conditions [at a time] when [the] Enigma secret was still of great importance for the Western Allies. Langer and his four comrades did not reveal [it] to the Germans, thus [making it possible to continue] exploiting this source of [intelligence] till the end of the war."

In mid-1945, liberated, Major Ciężki and Lt. Colonel Langer arrived in London, where they were badly received by Colonel Gano, chief of the Polish Section II in Britain. Gano had believed a distorted account by Lt. Colonel Bertrand that represented the failure to evacuate Langer's group from France as having been due to Langer's hesitation and lack of nerve. Langer and Ciężki were sent to a Polish signals camp at Kinross, Scotland, where Langer, bitter, disappointed, and convinced that he had been betrayed by the French when they no longer had need of him, died on 30 March 1948.

Ciężki died on 9 November 1951, after living the last three years on subsidies from the Assistance Board.

== See also ==
- List of Poles
