= Schwarzlose =

Schwarzlose may refer to:

== Firearms ==
- Schwarzlose MG M.07/12, an Austro-Hungarian medium machine gun
- Schwarzlose Model 1898, a German semi-automatic pistol
- Schwarzlose Model 1908, a German semi-automatic pistol featuring a "blow-forward" action

== People ==
- Andreas Wilhelm Schwarzlose (1867-1936), a Prussian firearms designer
