= Pokorný =

Czech or Slovak surname

Pokorný (feminine: Pokorná) is a Czech or Slovak surname, meaning "the humble one". Notable people with the surname include:

- Adolf Pokorny (1895–?), Austrian dermatologist
- Amos Pokorný (1890–1949), Czech chess master
- Beate Pokorny (born 1760s), Bohemian musician
- Bedřich Pokorný (1904–1968), Czech communist state security officer
- Franciszek Pokorny (1891–1966), Polish Army officer
- Frank Pokorny (1923–1999), American politician
- František Pokorný (1905–?), Czech sport shooter
- František Xaver Pokorný (1729–1794), Czech composer and violinist
- Franz Pokorny (1797–1850), Austrian theatre manager
- Gene Pokorny (born 1953), American tubist
- Hermann Pokorny (1882–1960), Hungarian general
- Jakub Pokorný (born 1996), Czech footballer
- Jaroslava Pokorná (born 1946), Czech actress
- Josef Pokorný (born 1955), Czech rower
- Julius Pokorny (1887–1970), Austrian-Czech linguist
- Lukáš Pokorný (tennis) (born 2002), Slovak tennis player
- Miloslav Pokorný (1926–1948), Czech ice hockey player
- Peter Pokorny (born 1940), Austrian tennis player
- Petr Pokorný (born 1975), Czech footballer
- Petr Pokorný (1933–2020), Czech theologian
- Regina Pokorná (born 1982), Slovak chess player
- Stefan Pokorny, Austrian karateka
- Stefan Pokorny (designer) (born 1966), Korean-American designer and artist
- Vladimír Pokorný (born 1980), Czech footballer

== See also ==
- 10205 Pokorný, minor planet
