= Gottfried von Banfield =

Austro-Hungarian pilot (1890–1986)

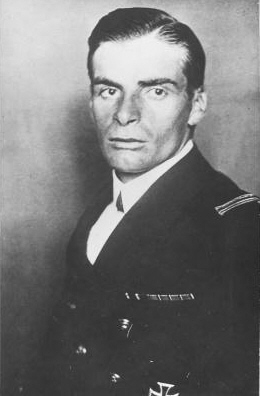
- Born: 6 February 1890; Castelnuovo, Kingdom of Dalmatia, Austria-Hungary
- Died: 23 September 1986 (aged 96); Trieste, Italy
- Relatives: Richard Banfield (Son)
- Military career
- Allegiance: Austria-Hungary
- Branch: Austro-Hungarian Navy
- Service years: 1909–1918
- Conflicts: Montenegro; Gulf of Trieste in June 1915
- Awards: Military Order of Maria Theresa; Large Military Merit Medal with Swords; Iron Cross First Class

Gottfried von Banfield (6 February 1890 – 23 September 1986), K.u.K. Kriegsmarine, a.k.a. "Freiherr von Banfield", was one of the most successful Austro-Hungarian naval aeroplane pilots in the First World War. He was known as the 'Eagle of Trieste' and was the last person in history to wear the Military Order of Maria Theresa. He scored nine aerial victories during the war, making him one of the only flying aces who flew a flying boat to five or more victories.

== Family ==
Of Norman origin, the Banfields were an Irish family in the 16th century. Thomas Banfield, an officer in the British army, while in Bavaria married an Austrian noblewoman. He took part in the Crimean War and died after the taking of Sevastopol. His son Richard Banfield, born in Vienna in 1836 and educated in Austria, chose Austrian citizenship, became an officer of the k.u.k. Kriegsmarine and took part in the Battle of Vis as one of the commanders on Wilhelm von Tegetthoff's flagship, the Erzherzog Ferdinand Max.

== Early training ==
Banfield was born 6 February 1890 in Castelnuovo, which is situated in the Bay of Kotor and was the homeport of an Austrian fleet. His father was a British subject, but the boy Gottfried took Austrian nationality.

He attended the military secondary school in Sankt Pölten, and the Imperial and Royal Naval Academy in Fiume: on 17 June 1909 he emerged as a Fähnrich. In May 1912 he was promoted to frigate-lieutenant. One month later he began pilot training in the flying school in Wiener Neustadt, and in August he obtained his flying licence. Enthused with aviation like his older brother, who had already become a well-known aviator, he was chosen to be among the first pilots of the Austrian navy, and went off to perfect his training at the Donnet-Lévèque pilot school in France, where his trainer was the company's chief pilot, the naval lieutenant Jean-Louis Conneau, a pilot famous at the time for having won many air contests under the pseudonym of André Beaumont. At the Pula naval air base on Santa Caterina Island he trained on seaplanes. As a result of a forced landing in 1913 he broke a leg so badly that the foot was barely saved. He was not airborne again until the outbreak of war.

== Wartime experience ==
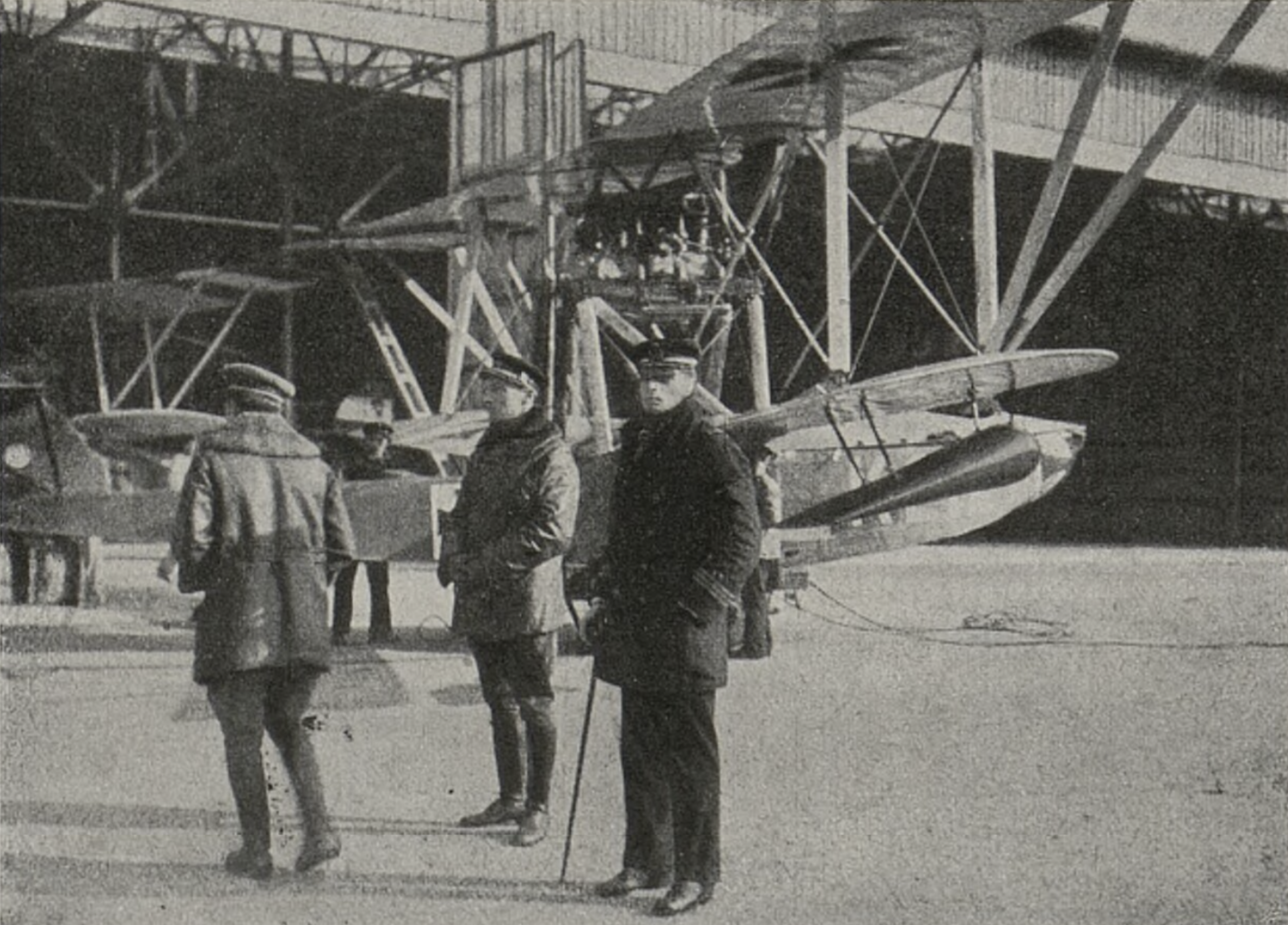
Lieutenant von Banfield in the front of Lohner L aircraft (c. 1917)

At the start of the First World War, Banfield was posted to fly the Lohner flying boat E.21 allocated to the pre-dreadnought battleship SMS Zrínyi for aerial reconnaissance. He took part in the first aerial actions against Montenegro from the Bay of Kotor. In the period following he worked as a test pilot and instructor at the airfield on the island of Santa Catarina off Pula. Once the Italians entered the war, he was commissioned with building up a larger seaplane station near Trieste, and after its completion was named as its commanding officer. He retained his command until the end of the war.

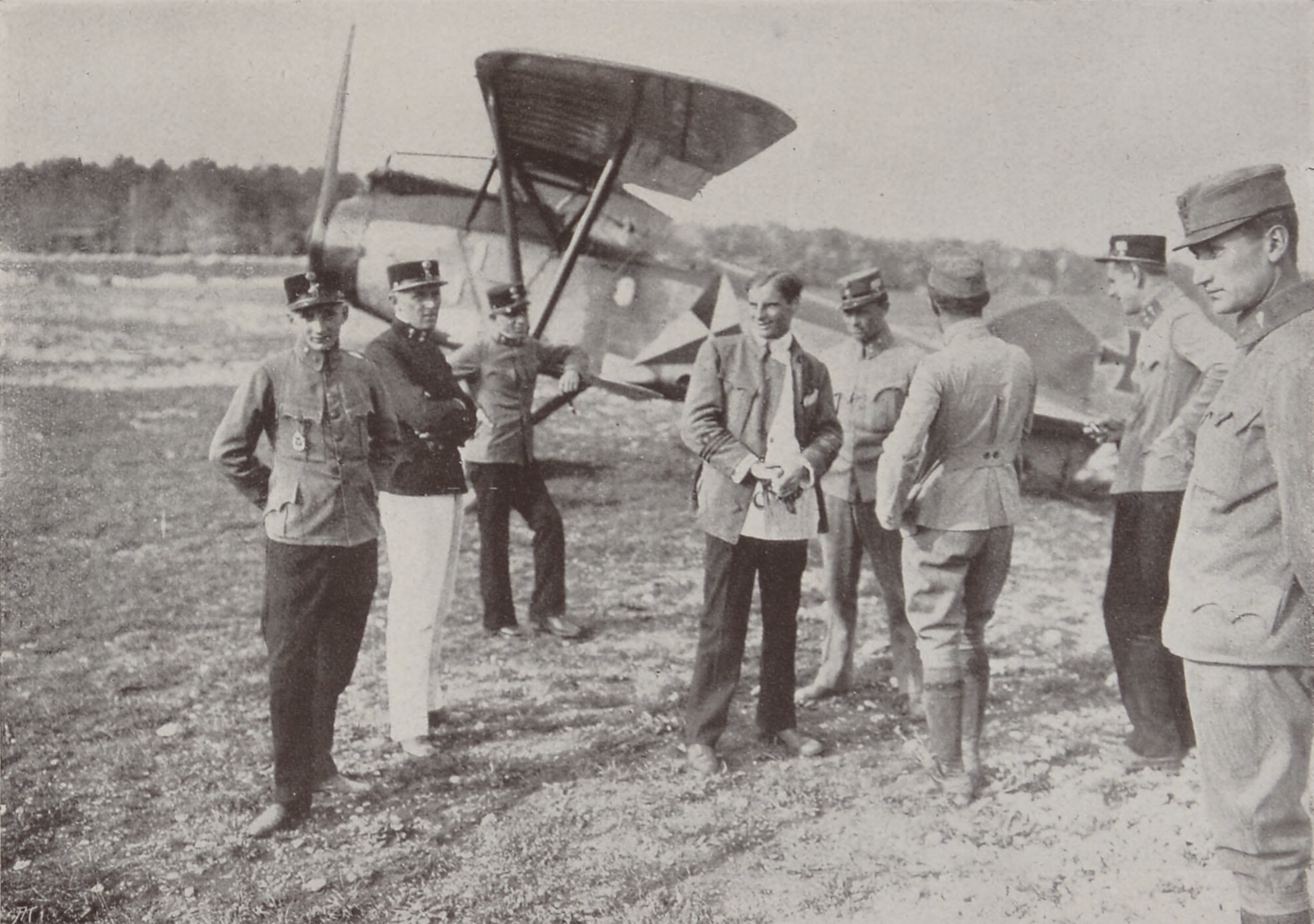
Banfield visiting at the Maria la Longa airfield (c. 1917)

He won his first air battles in a Lohner biplane seaplane against the Italians and their French allies in the Gulf of Trieste in June 1915, downing a balloon on 27 June. He even went up against his old teacher Jean-Louis Conneau in September 1915. Experimenting with a monoplane seaplane early in 1916, he won many victories and for a time held first place among the Austrian aces. In April 1916, he successfully developed the first indigenously designed Austro-Hungarian fighter aircraft of the war by modifying his twin-seater Lohner Type M into a single-seater with a forward-facing, unsynchronized Schwarzlose machine gun bolted to the hull in front of the cockpit. Banfield was also the first Austro-Hungarian pilot to shoot down an enemy aircraft at night, downing an Allied flying boat on 31 May 1917. He was wounded in combat in 1918.

== Decorations ==
Banfield's nine confirmed and eleven unconfirmed air-to-air victories make him the most successful Austro-Hungarian naval airplane fighter, and he holds a place among the most successful flying aces of Austro-Hungary. It was because he made most of his expeditions over the northern Adriatic that many of his claimed victories could not be confirmed. For his military services he was in 1916 decorated with the Grand Military Merit Medal with Swords. Established on 1 April 1916, this honour was intended for the "highest especially praiseworthy recognition" and was awarded only 30 times. 28 of its recipients were officers of general's rank; the other two were the cryptologist Hermann Pokorny (1918) and Banfield himself. On 17 August 1917 Banfield was further honoured when he received the Military Order of Maria Theresa. Individuals who received the order and were not already members of the Austrian nobility were ennobled and received the hereditary title of 'Freiherr', meaning 'baron' to their family name. At the time of his death in 1986, Freiherr von Banfield was the last living Knight of the Military Order of Maria Theresa.

== Trieste ==
After the First World War, the city of Trieste was annexed by Italy, and Gottfried von Banfield was for a time imprisoned by the occupation police. In 1920 he emigrated to England and became a British subject. He married the Contessa Maria Tripcovich (died 1976), of Trieste. They settled in Newcastle-upon-Tyne, where their son Raphael Douglas, known to the world as the composer Raffaello de Banfield Tripcovich, was born in 1922. In 1926, Gottfried took Italian nationality and returned to Trieste to become Director of the Diodato Tripcovich and Co. Trieste Shipping Company, which he took over from his father-in-law. Trieste Company ships then sailed under the Italian flag. Banfield became a celebrity of the city, usually called "Our Baron", Il nostro Barone, even winning a local tennis championship in 1927. He was a good enough player to qualify for the 1925 Wimbledon doubles Championship with Zerlendi as partner, losing in the first round. Serving as the Honorary Consul of France at Trieste, he was decorated with the Legion d'Honneur in 1977. Gottfried von Banfield died in Trieste 23 September 1986, at the age of 96.

== A military tribute ==
As a memorial, the 1990 graduating year's class of the Theresa Military Academy in Wiener-Neustadt, the greater number of whom had begun their foundation military service in the year of Gottfried von Banfield's death, called itself the 'Banfield Class.'

== See also ==
- Austro-Hungarian Aviation Troops
- List of World War I flying aces
