= Petr Pokorný =

Petr Pokorny may refer to:

- Petr Pokorný (composer) (1932–2008), Czech pianist and composer
- Petr Pokorný (theologian) (1933–2020), Czech biblical scholar
- Petr Pokorný (footballer) (born 1975), Czech footballer
