= Hellriegel =

Hellriegel may refer to:

- Hermann Hellriegel (1831–1895) was a German agricultural chemist
- Jan Hellriegel is a singer/songwriter based in Auckland, New Zealand
- Thomas Hellriegel (born 1971) is a German Ironman Triathlete
- Standschütze Hellriegel M1915 an early Austrian Submachine gun.
