= Pokorni =

Pokorni is a surname. It is a cognate or variant of the Czech surname Pokorný. Notable people with the surname include:

- Ljubomir Pokorni (1872–1944), Serbian general
- Péter Pokorni (born 1989), Hungarian footballer
- Zoltán Pokorni (born 1962), Hungarian politician
