= Raffaello de Banfield =

Italian composer (1922–2008)

- Born: 2 June 1922; Newcastle-upon-Tyne, England
- Died: 7 January 2008 (aged 85); Trieste, Italy
- Other names: Raphael Douglas, Baron von Banfield Tripcovich
- Education: "Lyceum Alpinum Zuoz"; "Dante Alighieri" Lyceum, Trieste
- Alma mater: University of Bologna; Benedetto Marcello Conservatory, Venice
- Occupation: Composer
- Notable work: See Selected works
- Spouse: Countess Maria delle Grazie Brandolini d'Adda
- Parents: Gottfried von Banfield; Countess Maria Tripcovich
- Awards: Grand Ufficiale (Italy); Grand Cavalier of the Légion d'Honneur (France)

Raffaello de Banfield (2 June 1922 – 7 January 2008), also known as Raphael Douglas, Baron von Banfield Tripcovich, was a British-born Italian composer.

== Family ==
Raffaello de Banfield was the son of Austro-Hungarian flying ace Gottfried von Banfield (last surviving Knight of the Military Order of Maria Theresa) and the Countess Maria Tripcovich (originating from Trieste), who acquired a permanent residence in England in 1920. He was born in Newcastle-upon-Tyne.

He was married to Maria delle Grazie dei Conti dei Brandolini d'Adda (1923-2017) on 27 December 1976. The marriage remained childless; Brandolini d'Adda had three children from her first marriage to Count Leonardo Arrivabene Valenti Gonzaga.

== Life ==
Raffaello de Banfield attended the Swiss International Lyceum Alpinum Zuoz, the "Dante Alighieri" Lyceum in Trieste, the University of Bologna and the Benedetto Marcello Conservatory in Venice led by Gian Francesco Malipiero. He studied composition from 1946 to 1949 at the National Conservatory (under the direction of Henri Busser) with Nadia Boulanger in Paris. In these years he met Herbert von Karajan with whom he had a lifelong friendship, and also with artists such as Pablo Picasso, Jean Cocteau and Francis Poulenc. In the United States, he belonged to the intellectual circle surrounding the writer and composer Paul Bowles, through which he met Tennessee Williams and Leonard Bernstein. In 1949 through the painter Leonor Fini he was introduced to the choreographer and ballet dancer Roland Petit; out of this grew the ballet Le combat ("The Duel"), which had its first original production in London in 1949. This piece, based upon the Tancred and Clorinda episode in Torquato Tasso's poem Gerusalemme liberata, was performed 39 times at the Vienna State Opera in the choreography of Dimitrije Parlic between 1959 and 1973. Until 1958 he spent time between Paris and New York and maintained a friendship also with Maria Callas. After years abroad in Italy, France, England and the United States, where he lived for more than ten years, he was from 1972 to 1996 Director of the Giuseppe Verdi Theatre in Trieste and he comprehensively renovated and modernised the Opera House. From 1978 to 1986 he was Director of the "Festival dei due mondi" ("Festival of the two worlds") in Spoleto, Italy.

He became famous for his compositions, which were performed worldwide and received countless honours and recognitions, such as the Italian "Grand Ufficiale"; in 1994, through François Mitterrand, he became a Knight of the Legion of Honour. He died at his home near the so-called "Rive" in Trieste, Italy.

== Selected works ==
- Le combat, ballet, Original production 1949 in London.
- Theatre Music for 'Much Ado About Nothing, 1953.
- Una lettera d'amore di Lord Byron ("Lord Byron's Love Letter", by Tennessee Williams), Original production 1955 in New Orleans with Astrid Varnay and Patricia Neway.
- Quatuor, ballet (1957)
- Acostino, ballet based on a story by Alberto Moravia, Original production 1958 in Genoa.
- Colloquio col Tango ossìa La Formica ("Conversation with the Tango or The Ant" by C. Terron), Opera in One Act. Original production September 1959 in Como
- Alissa, Opera in One Act with Four Scenes. Libretto by R. Miller. Original production March 1965 in Geneva
- Serale, (after poem of Rainer Maria Rilke), lyric work for soprano and large orchestra, 1968.
- Liebeslied, (after poem of Rilke), lyric work for soprano and large orchestra, 1968.
- Der Tod der Geliebten (The death of the beloved), (after poem of Rilke), lyric work for soprano and large orchestra, 1972.
- Der Sturm (The storm) (after poem of Rilke), lyric work for soprano and large orchestra, 1972.
- For Ophelia, concert piece for soprano and orchestra, Original production c1976 in London (Kiri te Kanawa, John Pritchard).
- Vier Rilke Lieder (Four songs of Rilke) for soprano and orchestra, original presentation 1986 in Brussels.
