= Joseph Riepel =

Joseph Rie

Joseph Riepel (Rainbach im Mühlkreis, 22 January 1709 - Regensburg, 23 October 1782) was an Austrian-born German music theorist, composer and violinist. Riepel is known for his theoretical work, especially for his innovations in theory of melody and form. Riepel's writings form one of the foundations for the theory of composition of the later 18th century. He was violin teacher to František Xaver Pokorný.

Riepel was the son of a farmer and innkeeper. He attended the Jesuit College in Steyr and began philosophical studies in Linz and Graz, but distinguished himself early on as a violinist. In 1735–1736 he toured the Balkan Peninsula as valet of General Alexander Graf d'Ollone in the 7th Austrian war against the Turks. From 1739 to 1745 he lived in Dresden, where he claims to have regularly frequented Jan Dismas Zelenka and the concertmaster Johann Georg Pisendel had by his own admission and received his first real musical training here. After living in Poland and Vienna, in 1749 he was band master at the court of the Princes of Thurn and Taxis in Regensburg, where he spent the rest of his life and created his theoretical writings and the majority of his compositions.

Riepel’s major theoretical work, Anfangsgründe zur musicalischen Setzkunst (“Foundations of Musical Composition”) consists of ten chapters, of which five were published in his lifetime (1752–1768), two were published posthumously (1786), and three remain in manuscript. His treatise on musical text setting, Harmonisches Sylbenmaß (“Harmonious Syllable Measurement”), was published in 1776.

The text of Riepel’s Anfangsgründe takes the form of a dialog between the Preceptor and his student, the Discantist, carried on in an informal manner, including humor and homespun expressions using regional dialect. Although the Preceptor generally articulates Riepel’s views, occasionally the Discantist is made to say something useful or correct. And occasionally his complaints or objections go unanswered. In fact, Riepel deliberately leaves some issues unresolved and significant points only hinted at. A full understanding of Riepel’s teaching requires interpretation of his musical examples, many of which convey essential points that remain unspoken.

The main points raised in the first chapter may be summarized as follows. Phrase symmetry is preferred, especially phrases of four bars. Clarity and order are prime values. Themes should be distinctive and recognizable. A balance between call and response should be created at several different levels of phrase hierarchy. Varying degrees of closure should be carefully controlled. Thematic recapitulation is normally required. Rising and falling melodic contours should be created over the course of several phrases. Motives should be elaborated by other than mere sequential continuation. "Sweet repetition clauses" that are more melodious, memorable, and harmonically stable than surrounding material are good for repetition. Homophonic texture is preferred. Adjacent phrases should be differentiated by contrasting types of melodic activity: smoking phrases are best at the beginning, singing phrases are best in the middle, and running phrases are best toward the end of periods.

The main points raised in the second chapter may be summarized as follows. The main building blocks of a composition are the segments concluded by and defined by a “comma” (Absatz). Riepel used the term Absatz for both the conclusion and for the phrase segments bounded and defined by it. With rare exceptions, an Absatz contains, or is built around, four metrical units, which are measures, half-measures, or pairs of measures, depending on the meter. An Absatz may appear as a simple four-bar phrase, but in more cases the composer will expand upon the basic structure with internal repetitions, elaborations, insertions, etc., and/or will extend the basic structure with additional concluding formulas. Each component metrical unit has a specific function, but the most important functional distinctions are between the first two metrical units, which create an implication, and the final two, which provide the realization. The conclusion of very Absatz must form the musically intelligible outcome of the preceding four metrical units by means of some amount of melodic, rhythmic, and metrical repose, and with one of only three possible harmonizations: V–I, I (or predominant)–V, or a full cadence, normally I 6/4 –V–I. These conclusions may occur in the keys of the tonic, the dominant, or of other degrees of the initial key. The hierarchy of keys is I–-V–vi–iii–IV–ii–i. Tonic-dominant polarity is crucial to pitch structure at all levels of hierarchy. Absätze should "converse" with each other in hierarchical patterns of implication and realization. The proper succession of phrase endings should assure implication and realization in hierarchical groups of two and three units ("the various commas must call and answer each other in an orderly fashion"). A logical progression of Absätze is to be maintained, while retrogression and redundancy are to be avoided. Repetition is the preferred means of expansion within an Absatz. All expanded Absätze refer to underlying simple Absätze, which gives them unity. The identity of an insertion rests upon the possibility of phrase continuity recognizable even when interrupted. The typical means of elaboration within an Absatz are repetition (with or without transposition). The typical means of extension of an Absatz are lengthening, shortening, or addition of commas, and redoubling of cadences. Texture should be animated by layers of non-contrapuntal rhythmic activity. The bass can take the melody for variety of elaboration. Clarity of texture is paramount. Juxtaposition of iii to I is considered typical of fugues but rare in symphonies. Three solo periods are typical in a concerto movement. Modulation to the subdominant must be balanced by more extensive modulation upward by fifths from the tonic (the principle is to maintain harmonic tension). Binary form usually has three periods, with a recapitulation at the end. Functional differentiation between phrases is conditional, bordering on syntactical. The first solo period in a concerto movement should begin with the first theme of the first tutti or a variant of it. Cooperation (concinnity) between several parameters in the creation of movement and/or closure is implied many examples and instructions. Metrical scansion (rhythmopoeïa) no longer applies best to patterns of notes but to patterns of measures and phrases. Beginning accented patterns, such as long-short trochee, are eliminated from consideration, leaving predominantly end-accent patterns with anacruses. Franz Benda (1709-1786), Johann Ernst Eberlin (1702-1762), C. P. E. Bach (1714-1788), and Johann Joachim Quantz (1697-1773) are mentioned or alluded to.

The first two chapters of Riepel’s treatise enjoyed wide circulation, as did their ideas. The very prolific symphonist Franz Xaver Pokorny (1729–1794) wrote in 1754 from Mannheim to his former patron in Regensburg, Count Philipp Karl, “I know Holzbauer, Stamitz, and Richter quite well; they maintain the very same theory that I learned from Riepel.” Mozart studied Riepel’s treatise. Heinrich Christoph Koch based his Versuch einer Anleitung zur Composition (7782, 1787, 1793) very directly on Riepel’s treatise, to the extent that Koch’s may be considered a revised updating of Riepel’s work.

== Works ==
- Responsoria pro Parasceve, Responsoria pro Sabbato Sancto
- Anfangsgründe zur Musikalischen Setzkunst (1752)
- Grundregeln zur Tonordnung insgemein (1755)
- Gründliche Erklärung der Tonordnung insbesondere, zugleich aber für die mehresten Organisten insgemein (1757)
- Erläuterung der betrüglichen Tonordnung (1765)
- Unentbehrliche Anmerkungen zum Contrapunct (1768)
- Baßschlüssel. das ist, Anleitung für Anfänger und Liebhaber der Setzkunst, die schöne Gedanken haben und zu Papier bringen, aber nur klagen, daß sie keinen Baß recht dazu zu setzen wissen (1786)
