= Schwarzlose submachine gun =

Experimental submachine gun from World War I

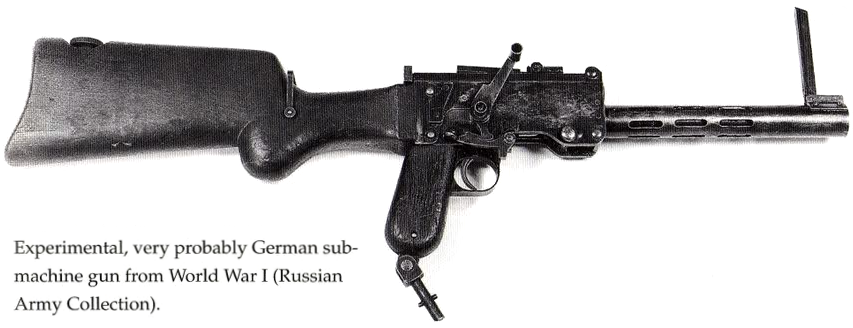
- Schwarzlose SMG without its feed box
- Type: Submachine gun
- Place of origin: German Empire

Production history
- Designer: Andreas Wilhelm Schwarzlose
- Designed: Late 1910s

Specifications
- Cartridge: 9×19mm Parabellum
- Action: Toggle-locked, recoil-operated
- Feed system: Multi-strip en-bloc clip (80 rounds total)

The Schwarzlose submachine gun was an experimental German submachine gun developed by firearms designer Andreas Wilhelm Schwarzlose. The design scaled down and adapted the toggle-locked recoil mechanism of the MG 08/18 to fire the 9×19mm Parabellum cartridge. Little documentation exists regarding its origins or if it ever saw field use.

== History ==
A specimen of the weapon is currently in the possession of Tula State University in Russia.

== Design ==
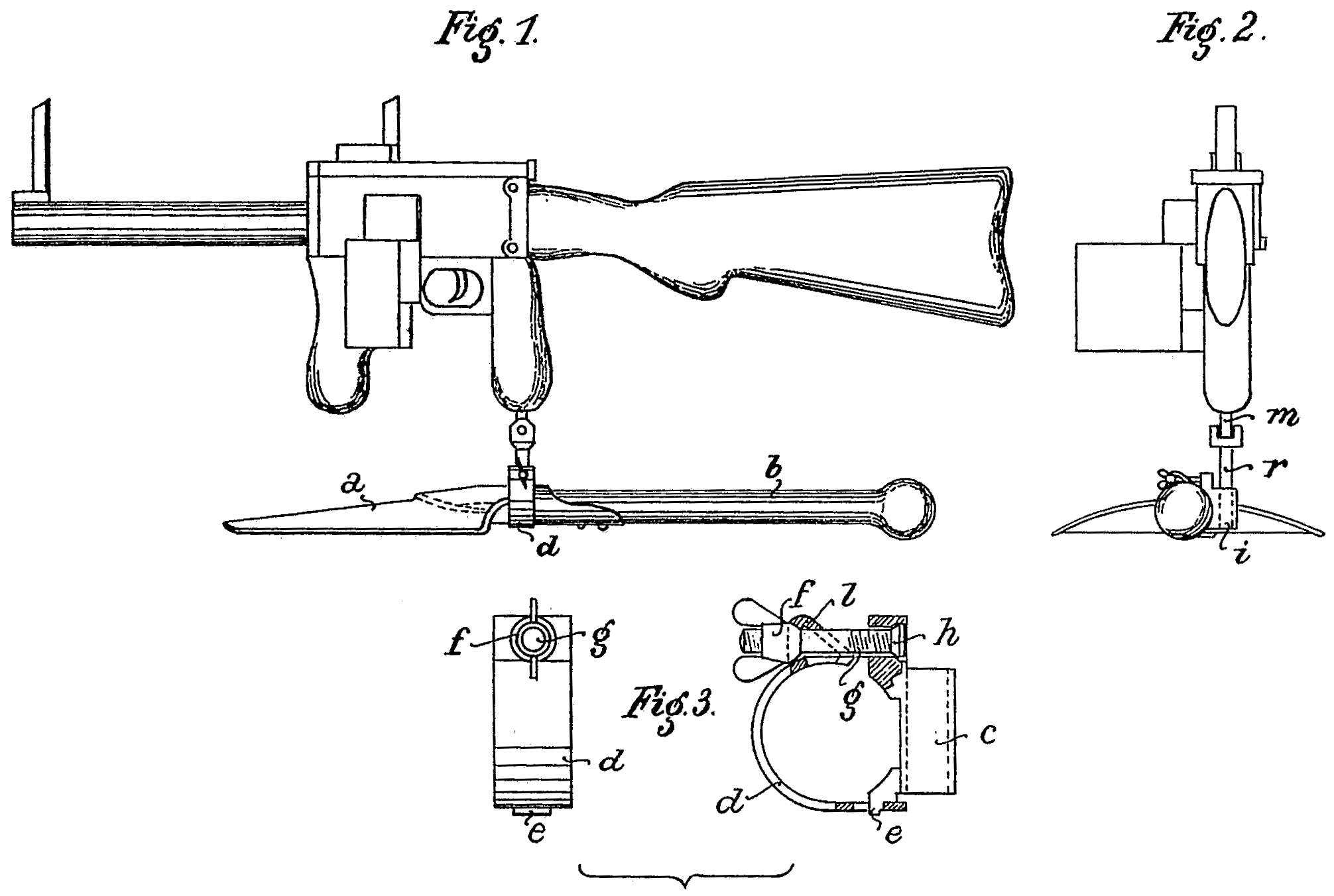
Patent DE000000332625A

=== Feed system ===
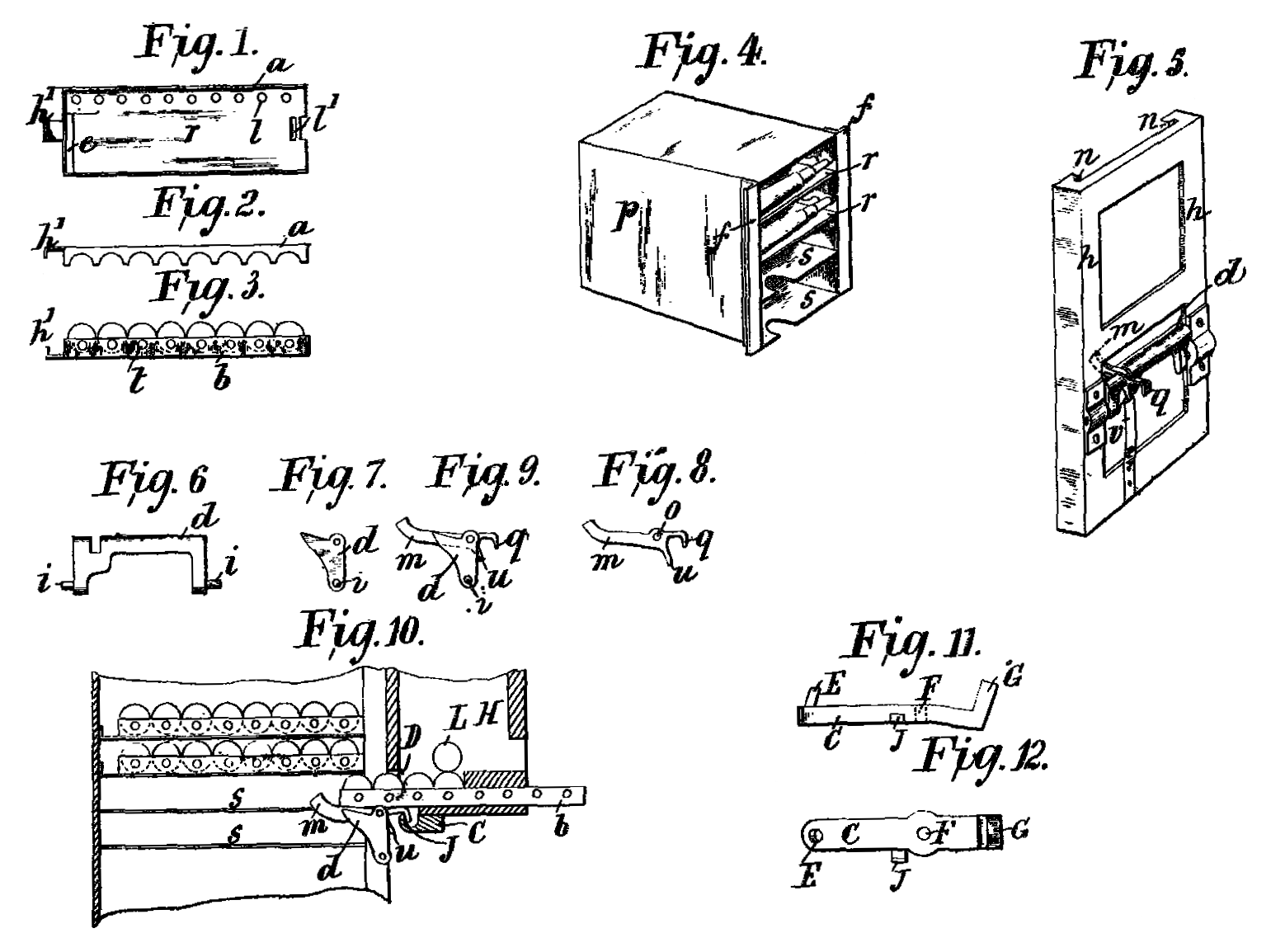
Patent GB000190200080A

The weapon fed from a multi-strip clip mounted on the left side of the receiver, holding a total of 80 cartridges. Strips advanced from the left as rounds were chambered, and when expended the strip would be ejected from a slot on the right side of the feed box, allowing the next strip to be moved into the feed position. This arrangement was similar to that of the Japanese Type 11 light machine gun.

The patent for the feed system, originally designed for full-size machine guns, was registered in 1902.

== See also ==
- Standschütze Hellriegel M1915 – Prototype submachine gun
- Luger pistol – Toggle-locked semi-automatic pistol
