= Schwarzlose Model 1898 =

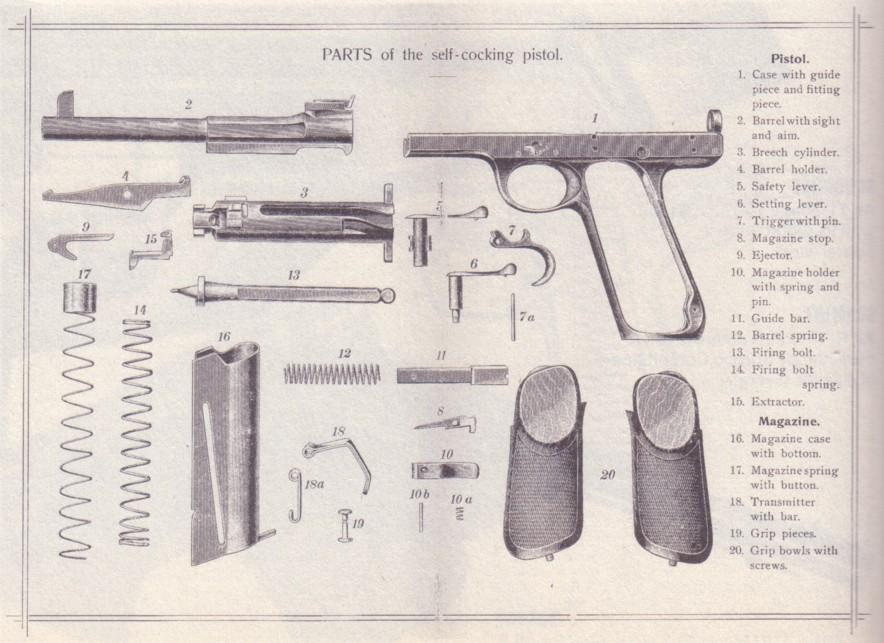
- Type: Semi-automatic pistol
- Place of origin: German Empire

Service history
- Used by: See Users

Production history
- Designer: Andreas Wilhelm Schwarzlose
- Designed: 1898
- Produced: 1898–1905
- No. built: <1000

Specifications
- Mass: 785 grams (27.7 oz) with empty magazine
- Length: 273 millimetres (10.7 in)
- Barrel length: 163 millimetres (6.4 in)
- Caliber: 7.65×25mm Borchardt; 7.63×25mm Mauser
- Action: Short recoil with rotating bolt locking
- Muzzle velocity: 390–441 m/s
- Effective firing range: 100 metres (110 yd)
- Maximum firing range: 600 metres (660 yd)
- Feed system: 6 or 8-round detachable box magazine
- Sights: Iron

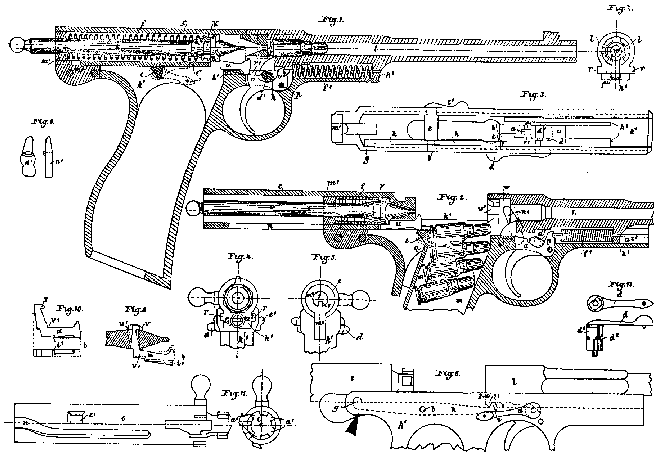
Diagram from the British patent for the Schwarzlose 1898

The Schwarzlose Model 1898 was a full-size, locked-breech, rotary-bolt, semi-automatic pistol invented by Prussian firearm designer Andreas Wilhelm Schwarzlose. It was chambered for cartridges such as the 7.65×25mm Borchardt and 7.63×25mm Mauser.

Most pistols used a six-shot detachable magazine, but a few were built with a larger frame for an eight-shot magazine. The rear sight was vertically adjustable, and the firing pin served as a cocking indicator by protruding to the rear. The Schwarzlose design was advanced for its time, but not widely adopted with less than 500 pieces being manufactured.

Small lots were sold to the Boers during the Boer War. Another lot was sold to members of the Russian Social-Democratic Party who were plotting insurrection, but were confiscated at the Russian border and issued to the Imperial Russian Frontier Guards.

== Users ==
- Orange Free State
- Russian Empire
- Transvaal

== See also ==
- Schwarzlose Model 1908
