= Standschütze Hellriegel M1915 =

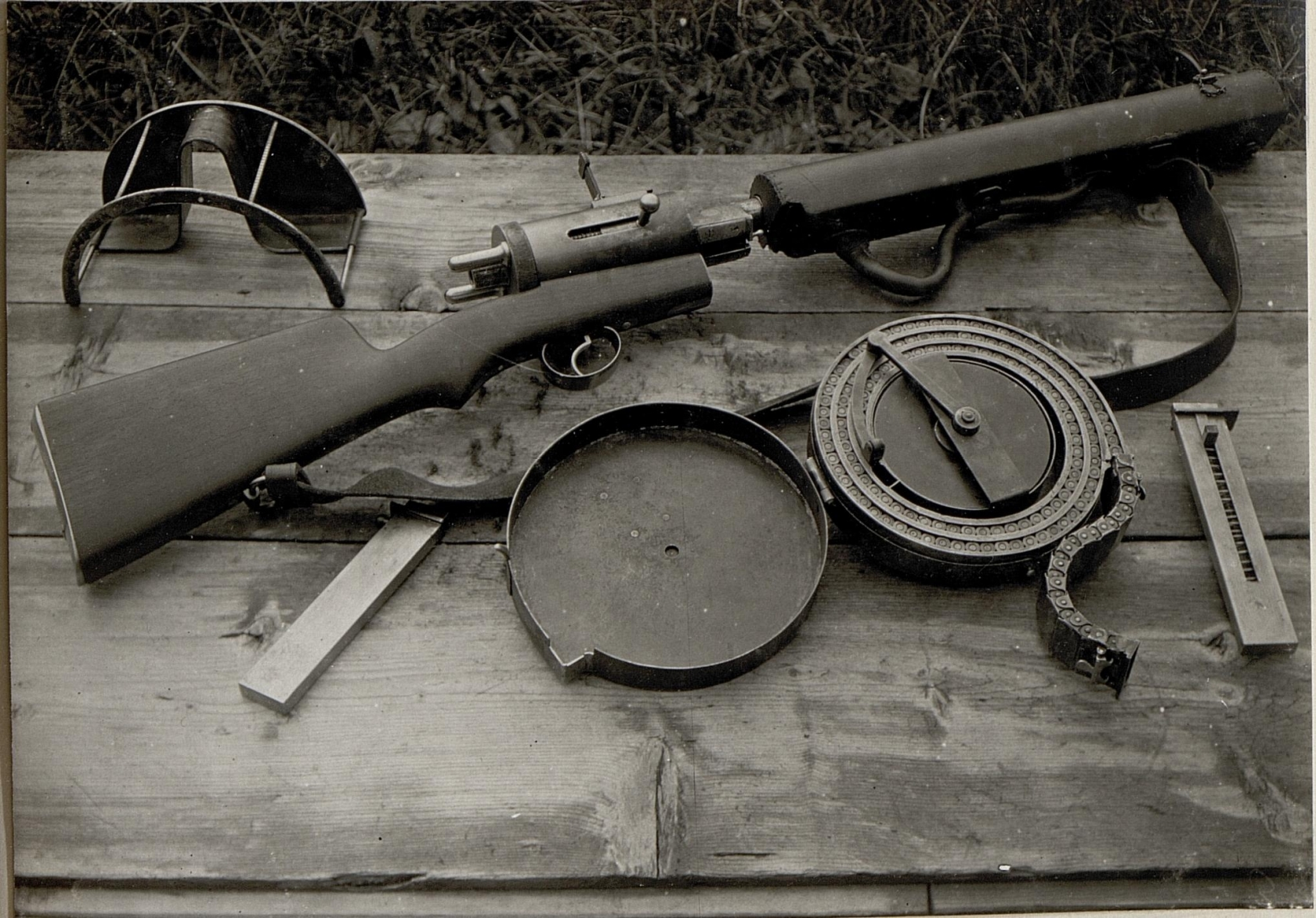
- Type: Sub-machine gun
- Place of origin: Austria-Hungary

Service history
- Wars: World War I

Production history
- Designed: 1915
- No. built: Unknown, at least 1 (conjecture)

Specifications
- Cartridge: 9x23mm Steyr (conjecture)
- Action: Blowback (conjecture)
- Rate of fire: 650-850 rounds per minute (rough estimate)
- Effective firing range: no estimate
- Feed system: 20 round stick to 160 round drum (conjecture)

The Standschütze Hellriegel 1915 (German: Maschinengewehr des Standschützen Hellriegel, lit. 'Machine gun of Standschütze Hellriegel') was an Austro-Hungarian water-cooled submachine gun produced during World War I in very limited prototype numbers.

== History ==
Little is known about the Standschütze Hellriegel Model 1915. The only source of information about the Hellriegel is several photographs stored in the photo archive of the Austrian National Library under the name “Maschinengewehr des Standschützen Hellriegel” (literally "Machine gun from reservist Hellriegel"). The photographs are dated October 1915 and they show the weapon being tested at a firing range. Its name and magazine size indicate that it was an automatic firearm, and its designer was someone named Hellriegel from the Austrian militia unit Standschützen, tasked with the defence of Tyrol and Vorarlberg regions of western Austria, the former bordered "neutral" Italy. It was most likely a prototype and therefore explains its "unfinished" look and design.

The development of this weapon coincided with the Italian entry into World War I on the side of the Entente, and its subsequent declaration of war on Austria-Hungary - its former ally in the Triple Alliance - which forced the Austro-Hungarian Empire to wage war on three fronts. It is possible that the idea of the weapon came from the frontlines, possibly from a senior officer, and the production of the prototype was carried out in a field workshop or in a small warehouse. However, it is also possible that it was created in the rear through someone else's own initiative. The Standschütze Hellriegel did not pass the prototype and testing stage and was forgotten. It is likely that only one weapon was produced and it was scrapped or disassembled.

According to army tradition, weapons are usually named in honour of their creator, the creator of this weapon was a man by the name of Hellriegel, who was possibly an officer or someone more junior in rank. The man in the photographs who was testing the weapon holds the rank of Feldwebel. Waffenmeister I. Klasse (literally "Field usher. Weapon master 1st class"), a rank for non-commissioned officers responsible for an artillery or weapon arsenal.

It is possible that the man photographed is Hellriegel himself, although unlikely. The only known Standschütze volunteer of that name was Dr. Richard von Hellriegel, the medical officer of Standschützen-Bataillon Kitzbühel. Other soldiers bearing the Hellriegel surname are served in the Kaiserjäger but none of them can be definitively linked to this weapon.

It is possible that this was the first-ever conventional submachine gun design to be tested; by this point, the Italians already had the 'Villar Perosa' submachine gun, though it was designed to be fired from a mount. The Hellriegel is certainly the first known submachine gun to have been designed with a buttstock, and therefore intended to be fired from the shoulder. The military theory behind the Standschütze Hellriegel's creation was likely similar to that of early light machine guns such as the Chauchat and Browning Automatic Rifle; A light machine gun that could be carried by troops, used in infantry assaults, and capable of suppressive fire.

== Design ==
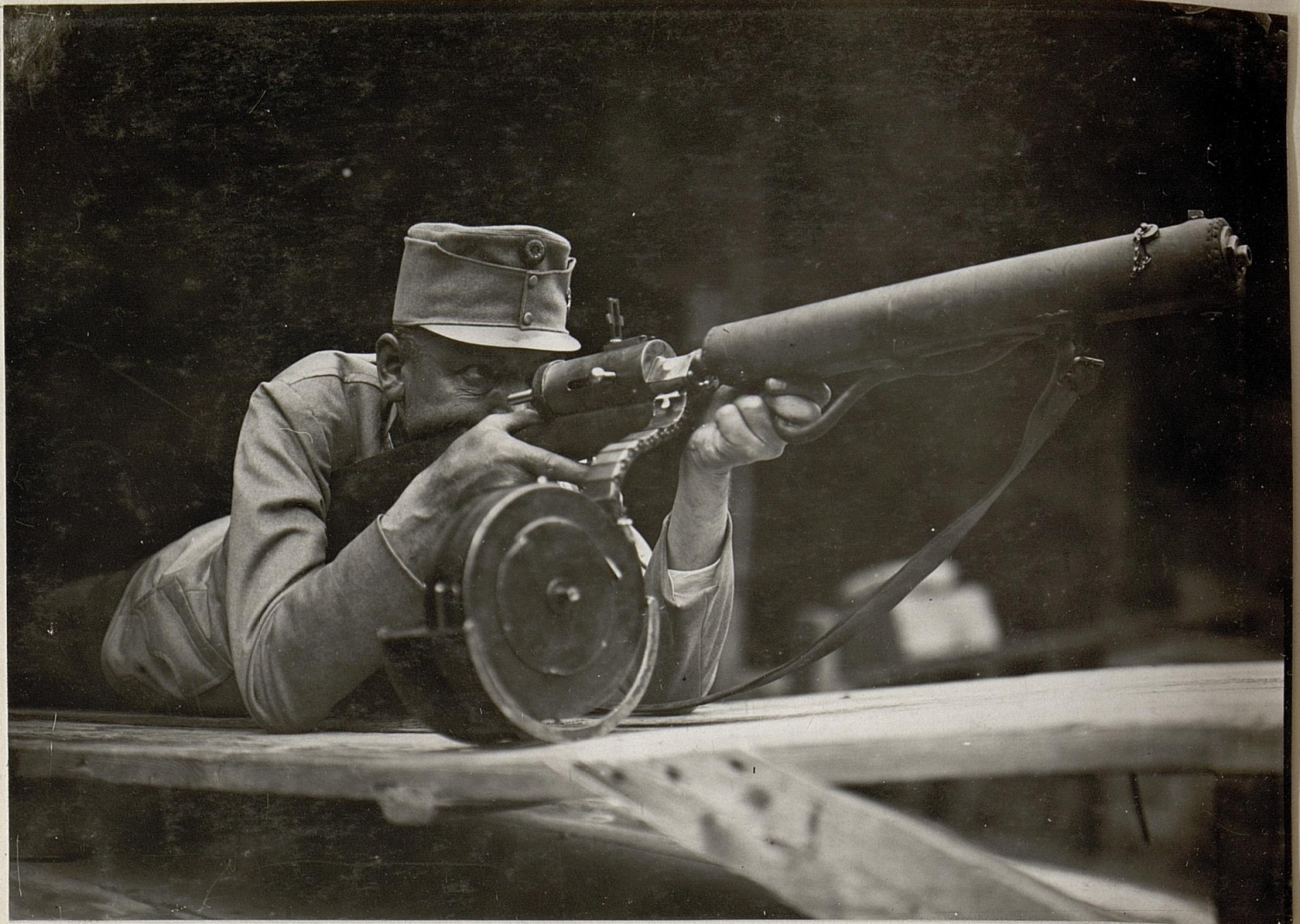
The Maschinengewehr des Standschützen Hellriegel in testing, 1915

Hellriegel's submachine gun was a fully automatic firearm. The gun had a water-cooled barrel. The cooling-jacket around the barrel bears similarities to that of the Schwarzlose machine gun, and had two openings, one to fill it with water and the other to release excess steam. It was covered with leather so it could be handled even after sustained firing. A bent tube was fixed under the barrel, which was used as a foregrip. The stock of the gun appears to be a modified version of the Mannlicher M1895 rifle stock, with a deeper cut thumb-groove.

Details about the internal operation of the firearm are not known. It appears to be blowback-operated, judging by its two coil springs which protruded behind the gun's cylindrical receiver. An iron sight was mounted on top of the receiver, with the rear sight appearing to be adjustable for range. According to rough estimates, the rate of fire of the gun could be about 550-650 rounds per minute. Although during actual combat the actual sustained fire rate would most likely be much lower.

=== Ammunition ===
Hellriegel's submachine gun may have fired the 9×23mm Steyr cartridge, which was the service pistol ammunition for most branches of the Austro-Hungarian military during World War I. Alternatively it may have been chambered for .32 ACP, which was used in the Hungarian Frommer Stop pistol. However, the cartridges shown in the photographs also resemble the 8mm Roth–Steyr cartridge used by the Repetierpistole M.1907.

Hellriegel's submachine gun could be fed from a drum magazine with a capacity of approximately 100-160 rounds. The magazine was not actually connected to the gun itself as the cartridges travelled through a flexible chute. The unusual appearance of the magazine has led many people to assume that the gun was belt-fed, however, this is not the case with the rounds being unconnected from one another and are propelled along the drum and feed chute by a spring. The design is very similar to the German TM 08 snail magazine, which was used in the Luger P08 pistol and MP-18 submachine gun. Apparently the gun could also use a box magazine with a capacity of around 20-30 rounds, which looks very similar to the box magazine of a Thompson submachine gun.

== Operation ==
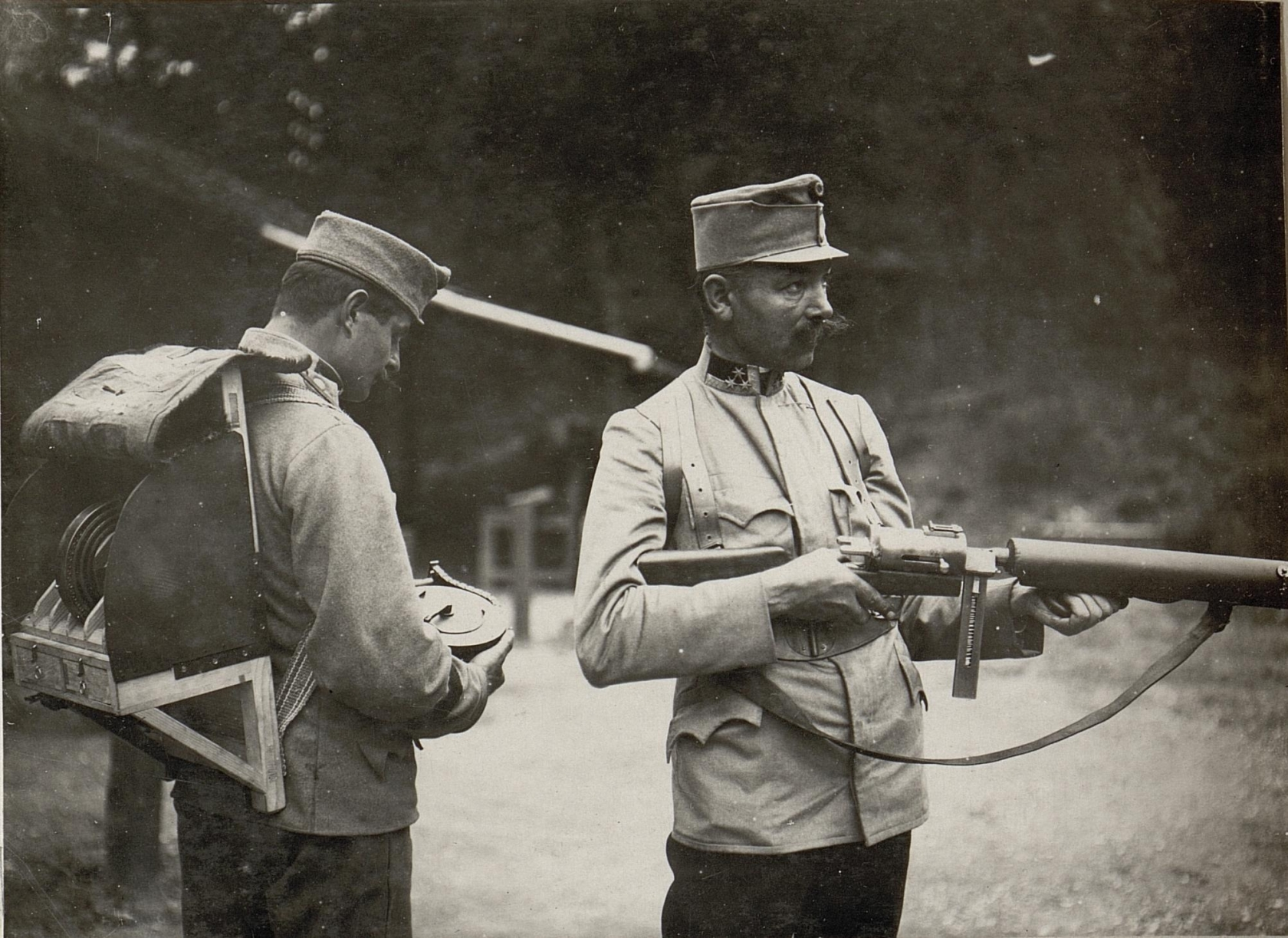
A soldier carries the Hellriegel's drum magazines while another carries the gun

As can be seen from the surviving photographs, the operation of the submachine gun required two men, a shooter and a magazine carrier. The magazine carrier wears a backpack that could contain five drum magazines, two box magazines and a kit for cleaning the weapon. The shooter wears a shoulder belt, which may have been used to carry the submachine gun. It is possible that the metal buckle on the belt was used for marching fire while shooting from the hip. A similar device was later used for the Browning Automatic Rifle, a "cup" that supported the stock of the automatic rifle when held on the hip.

== Disadvantages ==
The Standschütze Hellriegel did not have a bipod mount or any other support, which would be problematic for sustained fire. Presumably, the shooter was supposed to fire exclusively from the hip or from the shoulder, which would reduce the accuracy of the gun. Additionally, at the end of the barrel, there was no muzzle device used to suppress muzzle flash, which could temporarily blind the shooter during firing, further reducing the accuracy of the gun. However, this problem was likely alleviated through the use of pistol-calibre ammunition.

Another potential disadvantage of the gun is the connection of the submachine gun and drum magazine through a flexible chute. As can be seen from an existing photograph, when firing from a prone position, the shooter must hold the entire weight of the submachine gun, ensuring that the submachine gun is above the drum magazine, which must remain in an upright position. Not only does it appear to be relatively unergonomic in design, but it is also likely that if the shooter fires at a different direction abruptly, this would cause a failure to feed due to the gun's peculiar flexible chute feed system.

It is not known whether the tests of the Standschütze Hellriegel machine gun were successful, however, due to its many design peculiarities, complex engineering, and obscurity, it is very likely that the weapon tests were unsuccessful and the results were unsatisfactory. Another aspect of failure may be the cost of production, which due to the selected materials (such as leather) and manufacturing complexity, would be high. Additionally, the Austro-Hungarian army at that time did not have the resources for such an ambitious and unproven design. All this led the Standschützen Hellriegel Model 1915 to never advance past the prototype stage, becoming a forgotten weapon in history with nearly no surviving documentation.

== See also ==
- Schwarzlose submachine gun – Prototype submachine gun
