= Beate Pokorny =

Bohemian horn player (born 1760s)

- Born: 1760s
- Died: Unknown
- Occupation: Musician
- Relatives: František Xaver Pokorný

Beate Pokorny (probably born around 1760) was a French horn player from Bohemia. She may have been the daughter of the composer František Xaver Pokorný, and she is one of the earliest known female horn players.

== Historical accounts ==
Few accounts of Pokorny are available. The 1 January 1780 edition of the Mercure de France praises Pokorny's performance of a concerto by Giovanni Punto at the Concert Spirituel on 24 December 1779. A pair of 1780 advertisements in The Morning Post allude to concerts in London by "two Miss Pokorny" who both played the horn; a third advertisement indicates a concert for the benefit of the two Pokornys. The identity of the second Pokorny is unknown. Beate Pokorny is described as vituosic in two dictionaries, one from 1792 and the other from 1817.

== Analysis ==
According to musicologist Jan La Rue, the symphonies of František Xaver Pokorný have "exceptional" horn parts, which could be explained by having a skilled horn player as a daughter. Imyra Santana of Panthéon-Sorbonne University comments that more than one family of the name Pokorny is known to have been highly musical, and argues that the presence of a second horn player, likely her sister, suggests she came from a family of musicians. Santana also argues that she likely chose a concerto by Punto in order to demonstrate her virtuosity.
