= Schwarzlose Model 1908 =

Semi-automatic pistol

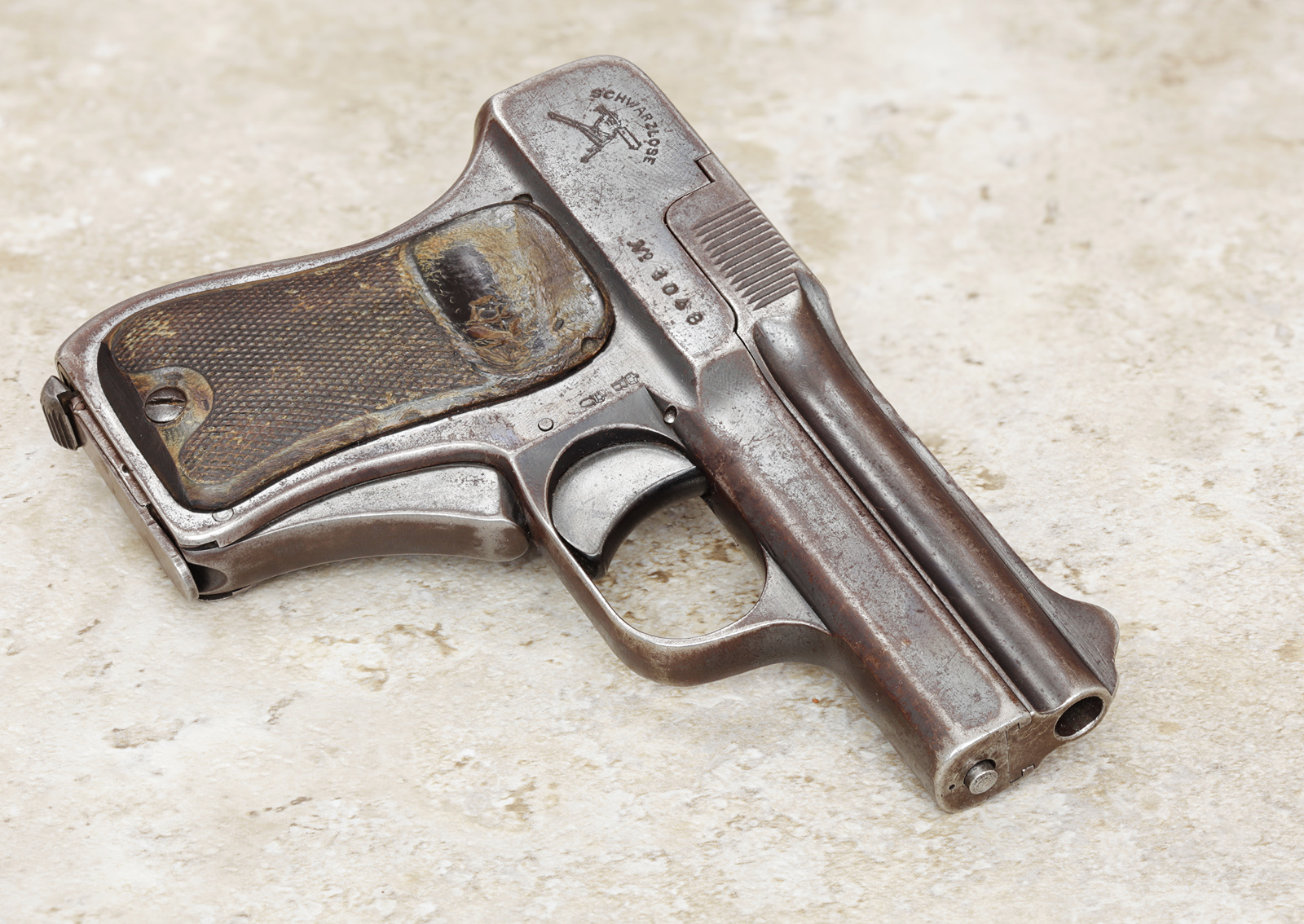
- Type: Semi-Automatic Pistol
- Place of origin: German Empire

Production history
- Designer: Andreas Wilhelm Schwarzlose
- Designed: 1908
- Produced: 1908–1911

Specifications
- Mass: 530 g
- Length: 142 mm
- Barrel length: 105 mm
- Caliber: 7.65mm Browning
- Action: Blow-forward
- Muzzle velocity: 305 m/s
- Feed system: 6-round detachable box magazine
- Sights: Iron

The Schwarzlose Model 1908 was a semi-automatic pistol, designed by Andreas Schwarzlose, released in 1908 in the German Empire and produced until 1911.

== Operation ==
The Schwarzlose employs a very distinctive "blow-forward action" operating mechanism. It has no slide, instead the mechanism is operated by the barrel being projected forward due to the gas pressure and the friction of the bullet passing through the bore, the compressed recoil spring drives the barrel back, stripping the top cartridge from the magazine, chambering the round, and pressing the cartridge head against the standing breech, which is part of the frame.

== See also ==
- Hino Komuro M1908 Pistol
- Schwarzlose MG M.07/12
- Steyr Mannlicher M1894
