= Andreas Wilhelm Schwarzlose =

Prussian firearms designer

- Born: Andreas Wilhelm Schwarzlose; July 31, 1867; Charlottenberg, Kingdom of Prussia
- Died: 1936
- Occupation: firearms designer
- Known for: Schwarzlose MG M.07/12 machine gun

Andreas Wilhelm Schwarzlose (31 July 1867 – 1936) was a German (Prussian) firearm designer who is best known for designing a blowback-operated machine gun.

== Early life ==
Schwarzlose was born near Wust, and served as an artilleryman and armorer in the Austro-Hungarian army. He graduated from the National Ordnance College and designed his first pistol in 1892, although it never saw production. In the 1890s, he lived and worked in Suhl, and designed the machine gun for which he became famous It was produced—mainly for the Austrian air forces—by the Österreichische Waffenfabriks-Gesellschaft. In 1897, he opened an arms factory in Berlin which he operated until 1919 when it was shut down by the Allied Disarmament Commission.

After the closing of his factory he worked as a firearms consultant until his death in 1936.

== Designs ==
- Schwarzlose submachine gun
- Schwarzlose MG M.07/12 machine gun (for Austria-Hungary)
- Schwarzlose Model 1898 semi-automatic pistol
- Schwarzlose Model 1908 semi-automatic pistol
