= Hermann Pokorny =

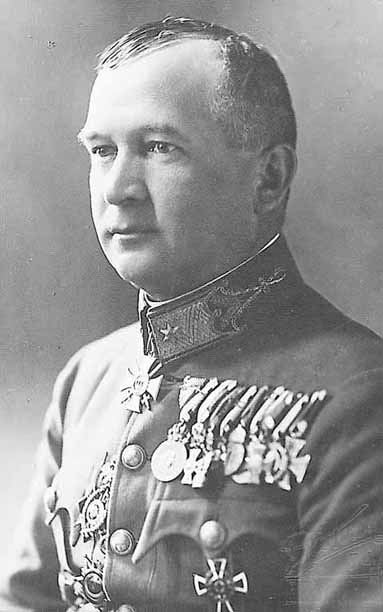
Hermann Pokorny (1925)

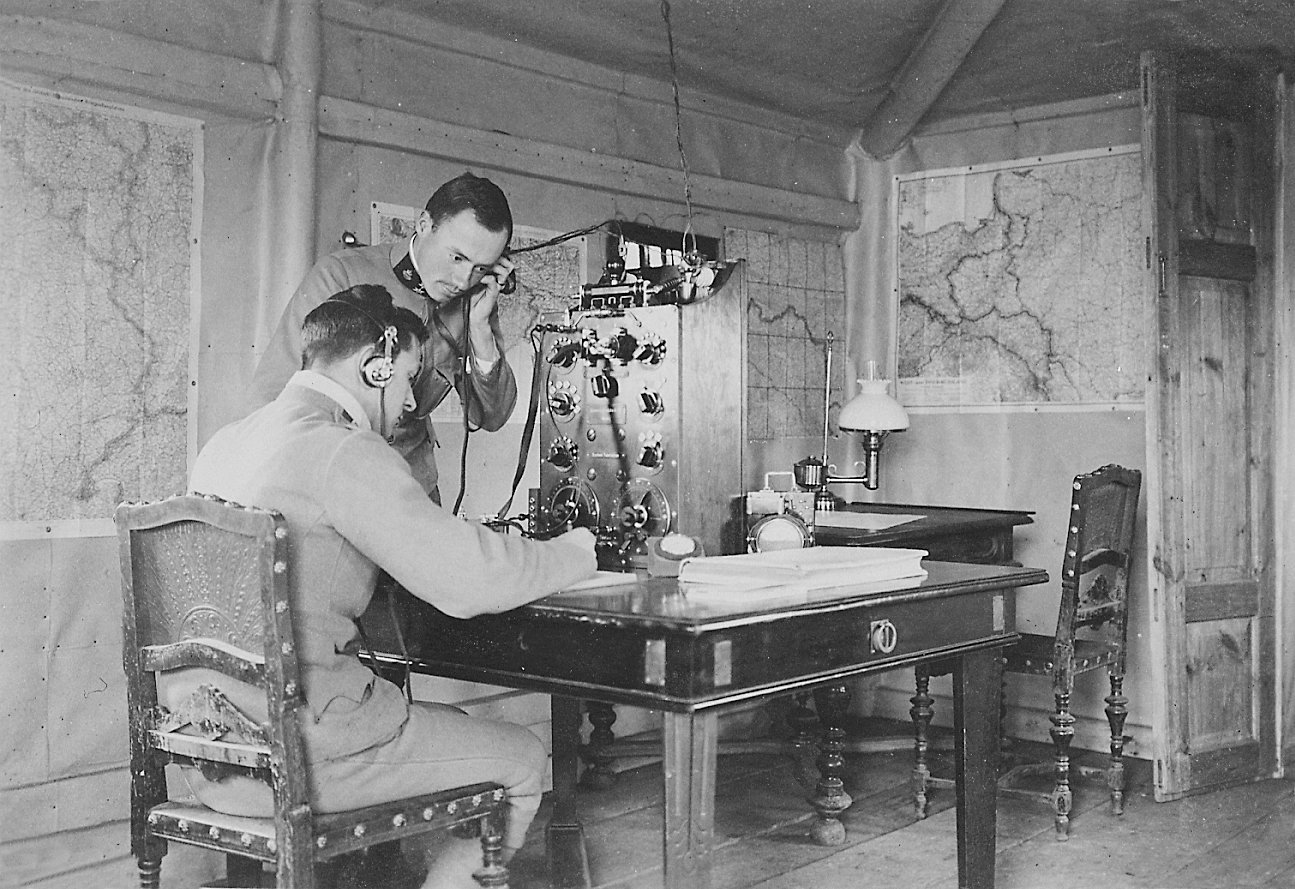
Pokorny during World War I

Hermann Pokorny (7 April 1882 – 18 February 1960) was a World War I Austro-Hungarian Army cryptologist whose work with Russian ciphers contributed substantially to Central Powers victories over Russia. He was a member of the Hungarian Order of Vitéz.

== Life ==
Pokorny was born in Kroměříž, Moravia in 1882, into a German-speaking family. His father was a postmaster. A cousin was Major Franciszek Pokorny, a Polish Army officer who after World War I headed the Polish General Staff's Cipher Bureau. In 1900 Hermann Pokorny joined the k.u.k. Austro-Hungarian Army. By 1918, when the Austro-Hungarian Empire fell, he was a lieutenant colonel.

During World War I, Pokorny, as a cryptologist in the rank of major, headed the Austro-Hungarian General Staff's Russian-Cipher Bureau. He showed great ability in decrypting Russian enciphered military messages that were broadcast by radio in 1914–17. He recognized that the Russian cryptographers had reduced the 35-letter Russian alphabet to 24 letters, while doubling the 11 missing letters to some of the other 24 letters. His break into the Russian military cipher system enabled Austro-Hungarian and German forces to act in advance of impending Russian maneuvers, thus contributing substantially to Central Powers victories over the Russians. He is mentioned in Soviet Marshal Boris Shaposhnikov's famous book, Мозг армии (The Brain of the Army, 1929). For his services to cryptology, Pokorny was decorated with the Large Military Merit Medal with Swords in 1918. Founded on April 1, 1916, this honour was intended for the "highest especially praiseworthy recognition" and was awarded only 30 times. 28 of its recipients were officers of general's rank; the other two were the naval aviator Gottfried von Banfield (1916) and Pokorny himself.

After World War I, as a German-language native speaker, Pokorny did not request Czechoslovak or Austrian citizenship because he was not welcome in Czechoslovakia on account of his German roots nor in Austria because he had been born on Czech soil. Accordingly, in 1918 he joined the Hungarian Army and made his new life as a Hungarian citizen. He was promoted to colonel in 1925 and retired in 1935 in the rank of major general.

During World War II, he was not called up for military service. After the Soviet Red Army captured Budapest in 1945, he volunteered to support Hungary's reconstruction. He worked for the Foreign Ministry (1945–1949). He went into his final retirement as a general, and died in Budapest in 1960.

== Ranks ==
- August 1900: Cadet
- October 1901: 2nd Lieutenant
- October 1906: 1st Lieutenant
- April 1910: Captain
- May 1915: Major
- May 1917: Lieutenant Colonel
- December 1921: Colonel
- May 1925: Lieutenant General
- December 1928: Major General
- October 1945: General

== See also ==
- Franciszek Pokorny
- Order of Vitéz
