= Lohner Type M =

Lohner M
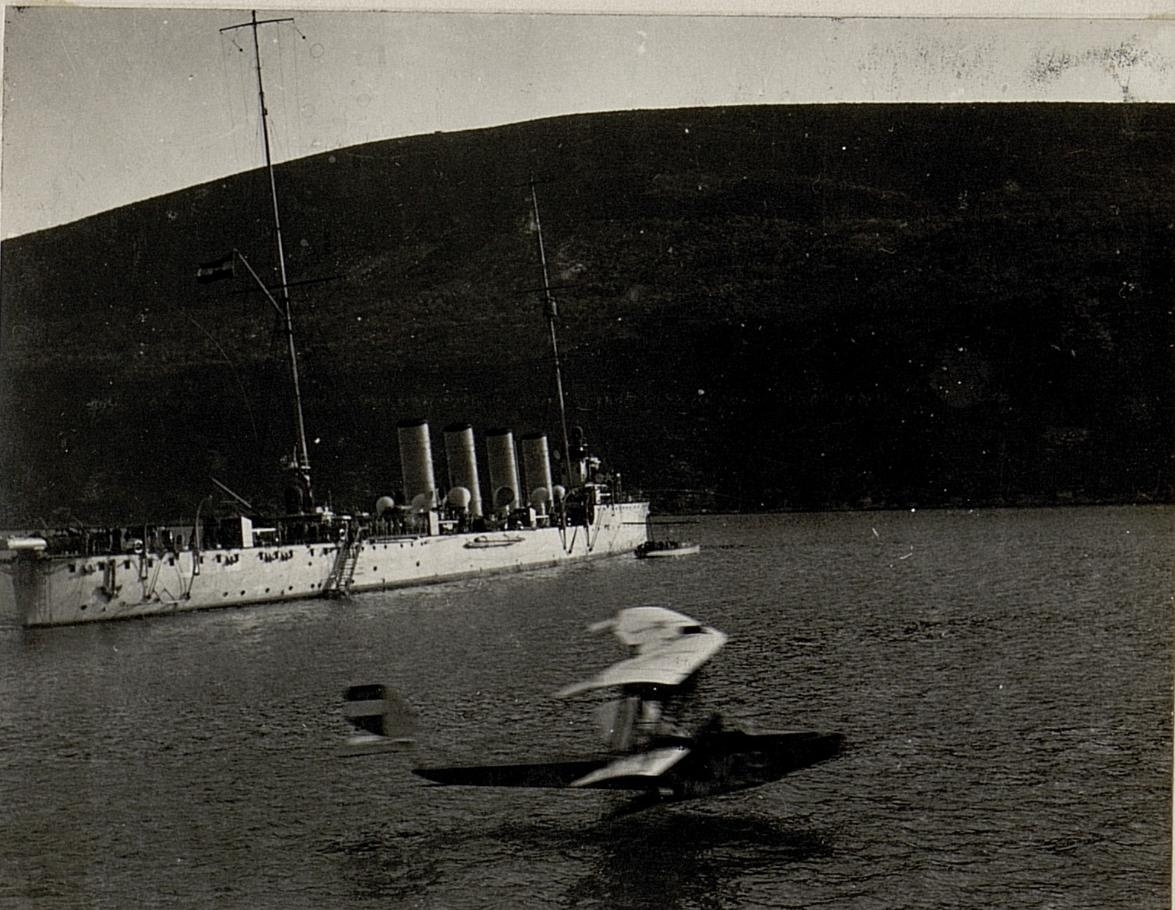
- Lohner M M.39 in flight on 23 February 1916, off Bavsic.

General information
- Type: Reconnaissance flying boat
- National origin: Austro-Hungarian Empire
- Manufacturer: Lohner
- Number built: 15

History
- Introduction date: February 1914
- First flight: 1914

The Lohner M was a reconnaissance flying boat produced in Austria-Hungary during World War I.

== Design ==
The Lohner M was a biplane flying boat with slightly backswept wings and the pilot and observer sat side-by-side in the cockpit. One version of the Type M, the "MkN", was designed as a mine-spotting plane.

== Variants ==
M
(M1) Initial production aircraft powered by 85 hp (63 kW) Hiero 4-cylinder water-cooled in-line piston engine; 4 delivered to KuK Kriegsmarine (E.17 to E.21).
Mn
(M2) Second production batch; 5 delivered to KuK Kriegsmarine (E.33 to E.38).
Mk
A single M powered by 100 hp (75 kW) Mercedes D.I (M.31)
Mkn

== Operational history ==
The Type Ms patrolled the Adriatic Sea from 1914 until spring 1915, but they were supplanted by the Lohner Type L. After 1915, the Type Ms were consigned to second-line duties, but remained in service until 1917.

== Operators ==
Austria-Hungary

- Austro-Hungarian Navy

== Specifications (M E.17 to E.21) ==
Data from Windsock Datafile 127: Lohner Type M

General characteristics

- Crew: 2 (pilot and observer)
- Length: 9.2 m (30 ft 2 in) overall

8.3 m (27 ft) hull only

- Upper wingspan: 13 m (42 ft 8 in)
- Lower wingspan: 8.4 m (27 ft 7 in)
- Height: 3.1 m (10 ft 2 in)
- Wing area: 31 m^{2} (330 sq ft)
- Empty weight: 580 kg (1,279 lb)
- Gross weight: 900 kg (1,984 lb)
- Powerplant: 1 × Hiero 4-cylinder water-cooled in-line piston engine, 63 kW (85 hp)

Performance

- Maximum speed: 90 km/h (56 mph, 49 kn)
- Range: 500 km (310 mi, 270 nmi)
- Endurance: ca. 5 hours
- Service ceiling: 2,500 m (8,200 ft)
- Time to altitude:

500 m (1,600 ft) in 7.5 minutes
1,000 m (3,300 ft) in 25 minutes

Armament

- Guns: 1 × trainable machine gun for observer
- Bombs: 50 kg (110 lb) of bombs

== See also ==
Related development

- Lohner L

Related lists

- List of maritime patrol aircraft
- List of flying boats and floatplanes
- List of World War I Central Powers aircraft
