= Franciszek Pokorny =

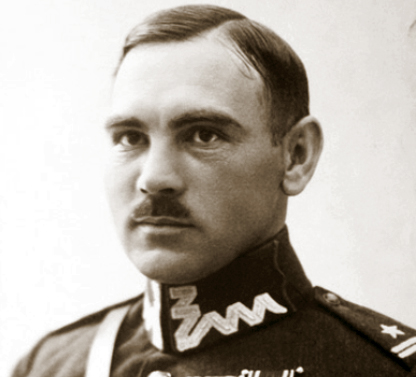
Franciszek Pokorny

Major Franciszek Pokorny (15 June 1891 in Mosty, Austria-Hungary – 22 November 1966 in Edinburgh, Scotland) was a Polish Army officer who, after World War I, headed the Polish General Staff's Cipher Bureau before Major (eventually, Lt. Col.) Gwido Langer.

== Life ==
When the first German military Enigma-enciphered messages were broadcast by radio on 15 July 1928, the Cipher Bureau's German section attempted unsuccessfully to decrypt them. Likely due to the successes of leading Polish mathematicians in breaking Russian ciphers during the Polish-Soviet War (1919–21), a secret cryptology course was conducted in 1929 at Poznań University for selected mathematics students with a knowledge of the German language. Three participants in the course — Marian Rejewski, Jerzy Różycki and Henryk Zygalski — were, three years later, hired by the Cipher Bureau.

Pokorny was the third man to lecture in the course, after engineer Antoni Palluth and then-Capt. Maksymilian Ciężki.

Franciszek Pokorny was a cousin of the outstanding Austro-Hungarian Army cryptologist during World War I, Hermann Pokorny.
