= František Xaver Pokorný =

Czech composer and violinist (1729-1794)

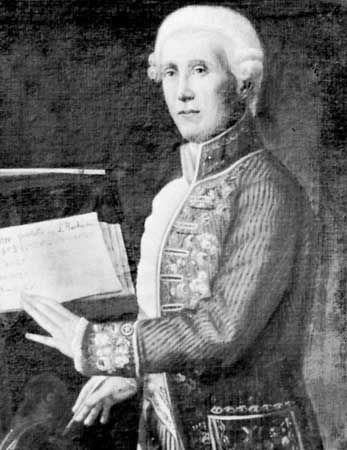
- František Xaver Pokorný
- Born: František Xaver Pokorný; 20 December 1729; Stříbro, Czech Republic
- Died: 2 July 1794 (aged 64); Regensburg, Germany
- Relatives: Beate Pokorny

František Xaver Pokorný (20 December 1729, Stříbro – 2 July 1794, Regensburg) was a Czech composer and violinist of the classical period.

== Life and career ==
František Xaver Pokorný was born on 20 December 1729 in Mies (now Stříbro). While young, he left his hometown for Regensburg where he studied violin playing with Joseph Riepel. In 1750 he went to Wallerstein, where he played violin in the Oettingen-Wallerstein court orchestra. In 1753 he went to Mannheim where he further studied with Johann Stamitz and Ignaz Holzbauer among others. After the death of Philip Charles Domenic Oettingen-Wallerstein in 1766 he asked for permission to leave the court for three to four years. He spent the last part of his life in the orchestra of Karl Anselm, 4th Prince of Thurn and Taxis, again in Regensburg.

Nearly 150 symphonies are attributed to him, but his authorship is disputed for more than fifty of these, as after his death his surname was erased from his works and replaced by names of other authors by Theodor von Schacht, intendant of the Regensburg orchestra. Furthermore, many works for wind instruments, tens of solo concertos including 45 for harpsichord and 3 for two horns are attributed to him.

Musicologist Jan La Rue describes Pokorný's horn parts as "exceptional", which he attributes to his having a horn player, Beate Pokorny, as a daughter.
