= Petr Pokorný (footballer) =

Czech footballer (born 1975)

Personal information
- Full name: Petr Pokorný
- Date of birth: 28 December 1975 (age 50)
- Place of birth: Hradec Králové, Czechoslovakia
- Height: 1.85 m (6 ft 1 in)
- Position: Defender

Senior career*
Years	Team	Apps	(Gls)
1995	Chrudim 1887	6	(0)
1996–1999	Hradec Králové	94	(4)
1999–2001	Teplice	37	(0)
2001–2002	Xaverov Horní Počernice	12	(0)
2002–2003	Mladá Boleslav	22	(0)
2004	Hradec Králové	4	(0)
2004–2006	Zagłębie Lubin	37	(2)
2007–2009	Śląsk Wrocław	45	(5)
2009–2011	Górnik Polkowice	54	(2)
Total		311	(13)

International career
1997	Czech Republic U21	1	(0)
- * Club domestic league appearances and goals

Petr Pokorný (born 28 December 1975) is a Czech former professional footballer who played as a defender. Between 1995 and 2001 he played in the Czech First League, making 130 appearances.

== Honours ==
Zagłębie Lubin

- Ekstraklasa: 2006–07

Śląsk Wrocław

- Ekstraklasa Cup: 2008–09
