= Schwarzlose machine gun =

Maschinengewehr (Schwarzlose) M. 7
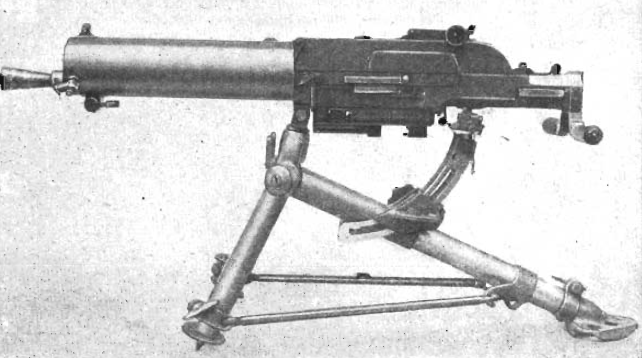
- A Schwarzlose Model 1907/12
- Type: Heavy machine gun (Note: By modern standards the Schwarzlose can be classified as a medium machine gun, but when the gun was first introduced into service, the term HMG referred to the gun overall weight, not that it fired a large caliber cartridge.)
- Place of origin: Austria-Hungary

Service history
- In service: 1907–1948
- Used by: See § Users
- Wars: List of conflicts: Balkan Wars; World War I; Russian Civil War; Austro-Slovene conflict in Carinthia; Polish–Soviet War; Greco-Turkish War (1919–22); Constitutionalist Revolution; Colombia–Peru War; Austrian Civil War; Spanish Civil War; World War II; 1948 Arab–Israeli War

Production history
- Designer: Andreas Wilhelm Schwarzlose
- Designed: 1904
- Manufacturer: Steyr; Hembrug Arsenal; Carl Gustafs stads gevärsfaktori
- Produced: 1905–1940
- Variants: See § Variants

Specifications
- Mass: Gun & tripod: 41.4 kg (91.27 lb)
- Length: 945 mm (37.20 in)
- Barrel length: 530 mm (20.87 in)
- Cartridge: 8×50mmR Mannlicher; 8×56mmR Steyr; List of other cartridges: 6.5×50mmSR Arisaka; 6.5×52mm Carcano; 6.5×53mmR; 6.5×54mm Greek; 6.5×55mm; 7.62×54mmR; 7.7×56mmR; 7.92×57mm Mauser
- Action: Toggle-delayed blowback
- Rate of fire: 400–580 rounds/min (M.7/12); 600–880 rounds/min (MG-16A)
- Feed system: 250-round cloth belt

The Maschinengewehr (Schwarzlose) M. 7, also known as the Schwarzlose MG, is a heavy machine gun, used as a standard issue firearm in the Austro-Hungarian Army throughout World War I. A simple and robust design, it remained in use with the Italian and Hungarian armies until the end of World War II.

== History ==
In 1888, Archduke Karl Salvator of Austria and Count George von Dormus patented a delayed blowback machine gun, which was adopted by the Austro-Hungarian Army with a few modifications as the Škoda M1893 primarily for use in fortifications; Škoda Works later introduced a version with an improved feed system, the M1902, but only a few were built. Meanwhile, Andreas Wilhelm Schwarzlose began working on a delayed blowback machine gun design of his own—filling patents as early as 1900, and in 1907, the Austro-Hungarian Army selected Schwarzlose's design as a replacement for the Škoda machine gun. According to firearms author George M. Chinn, a blowback system was deliberately chosen as it was easier to manufacture than the Maxim and to avoid the gas operation used on Hotchkiss machine gun. (Note: Schwarzlose sought to avoid paying royalties to Hotchkiss et Cie.)

First produced in 1905 by Steyr, the Schwarzlose was issued to Austro-Hungarian infantry, cavalry, and mountain units in batteries with four guns each. Infantry units were issued M 07s with tripod mounts and transported by pack horses on a regimental level. By 1914, the Austro-Hungarian Army had a total of 2,761 machine guns in service, with each infantry regiment equipped with four machine gun sections with two Schwarzloses each — one section per battalion, at least on paper.

Cavalry units employed a team of three horses: one to carry the gun plus 500 rounds of ammunition while the rest carried 1,500 rounds of ammunition; during mobilization, two ammunition horses were added for each gun. Mountain machine gun batteries were similarly organized, with one horse carrying the Schwarzlose plus 11,000 rounds of ammunition while the ammunition horses carried 2,000 rounds each. Each machine gun was crewed by three or four soldiers with additional troops to carry extra ammunition, usually led by a non-commissioned officer.

The Austro-Hungarian Navy mounted the Schwarzlose on surface ships as anti-aircraft (AA) guns including the Erzherzog Karl and Tegetthoff-class battleships. The M 07/12 was also used by the Austro-Hungarian Aviation Troops (LFT), where it proved to be difficult to synchronize with the aircraft engines, and due to shortages of precision tools required to build enough synchronization gears once suitable designs were developed, the LFT aircraft were often fitted with improvised mountings on the field.

The Schwarzlose was simple to operate, reliable, and its rate of fire of 400 rounds per minute is superior over the Škoda; (Note: The Škoda had a rate of fire of 180–250 rpm.) it also had the advantage of costing about half the price of a Maxim gun. Prior to 1912, the Schwarzlose was adopted by the Netherlands (1908), followed by Greece, Serbia, Romania, Bulgaria, Sweden, and the Ottoman Empire. In 1912, the improved M 07/12 with an increased rate of fire was introduced into service.

While Andreas Schwarzlose built the first prototypes in his private workshop, Steyr was the sole manufacturer until 1917. In that year, the Dutch set up their own production line at Hembrug to supply their military with Schwarzloses—production at the Hembrug Arsenal continued until 1940. Sweden also locally produced their own copies at the Carl Gustafs Stads Gevärsfaktori factory in Eskilstuna from 1917–1939. Unlicensed copies were made by the Chinese, with the Sichuan Arsenal producing a small batch for the warlord Xiong Kewu starting in 1918, while the Guangdong Arsenal also produced a small number in the early 1920s.

During World War I, the Austrians lost a large number of M 07/12s in the Eastern Front in 1914–1915 and they were forced to order a large number of Škoda M1913s to supplement it. The Imperial Russian Army made use of captured Schwarzloses alongside their own Maxims. In the Italian Front, the Austro-Hungarian Army made effective use of machine guns, repelling the numerically superior but outgunned Italian forces, (Note: While the Austrians started the war well supplied with machine guns and ammunition, the Italians faced difficulties importing Vickers from Britain since they were in high demand by the British Army and Italy remained neutral until 1915, while the domestically-produced Fiat–Revelli Modello 1914 fired a lighter cartridge than the Schwarzlose.) and inflicting a large number of casualties during the Battles of the Isonzo.

During the interwar period, the M 07/12 was used by the successor states of Austria-Hungary including Austria, Hungary, Czechoslovakia, Poland, and Yugoslavia, and saw action in several conflicts such as the Russian Civil War, Polish–Soviet War, Greco–Turkish War, Colombia–Peru War, and the Spanish Civil War.

Italy received approximately 900 M 07/12s as war reparations from Austria-Hungary, issuing them to colonial troops in Africa, often in the anti-aircraft role. The Italians kept them in service until the end of World War II. During WWII, the Wehrmacht pressed captured Austrian, Dutch, Greek, Italian, and Yugoslav guns into service, issuing them to second-line troops for anti-partisan operations or to bolster AA batteries. During the final months of the war, the Schwarzlose was also used by the Volkssturm militia.

== Design ==
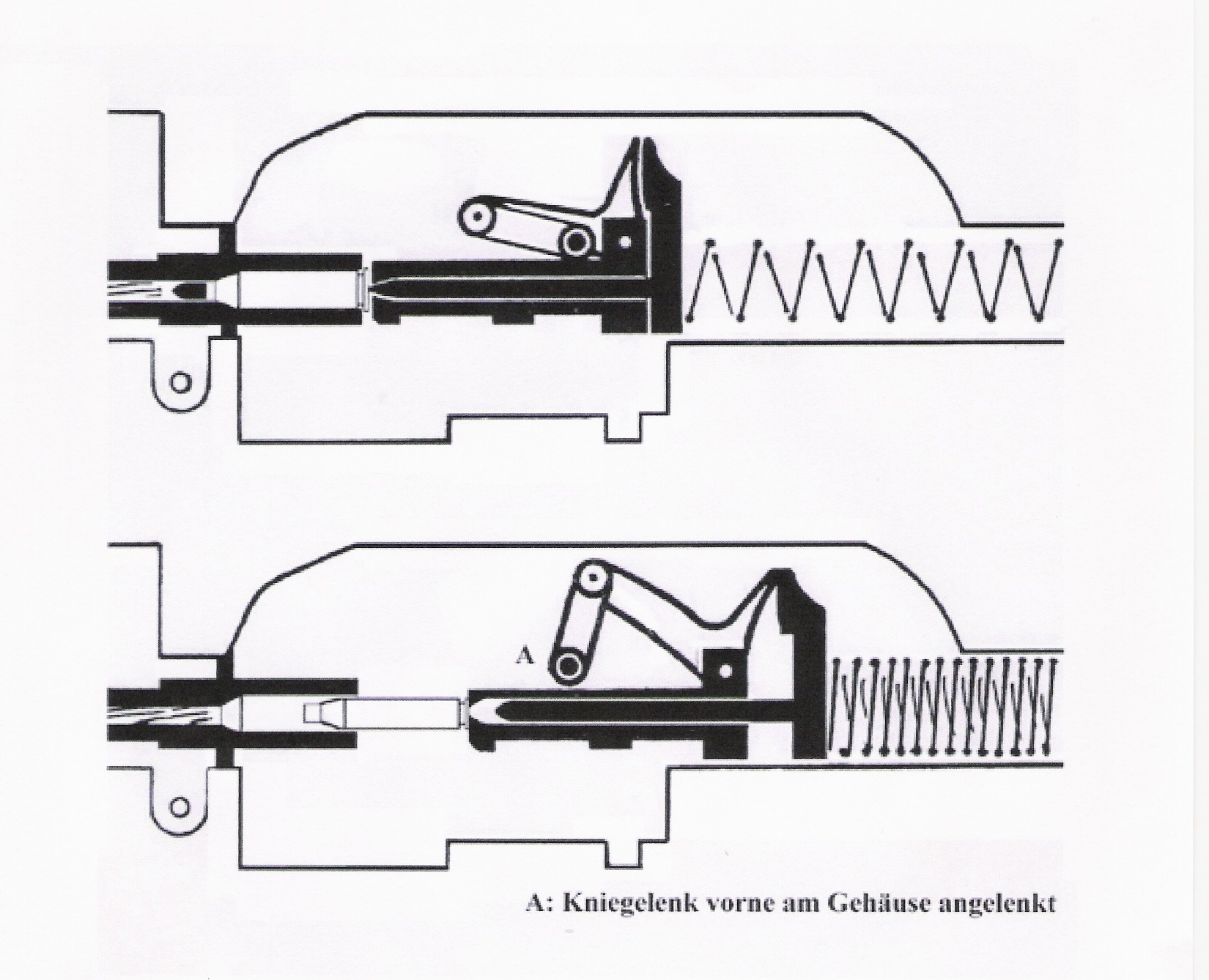
Toggle-delayed blowback operation of the 07/12 machine gun.

The Schwarzlose is a toggle-delayed blowback, water-cooled machine gun. In comparison to the Maxim gun, the Model 1907 is simpler: it uses a single spring against 14 of the Maxim, 11 breech components plus 13 screws and pins while the Maxim uses 35 and 52 respectively; The M 07 is also about 10 kg (22 lb) lighter. (Note: Balck gives the weight for the gun frame with a full water jacket, without the tripod as 17.5–18 kg (39–40 lb) for the Schwarzlose M.7 and 27.5–28 kg (61–62 lb) for the Maxim.) The bolt mechanism incorporates a device that oils cartridge cases to ease extraction. The only unusual feature about the gun is the need to open the top cover to load the ammunition belts and ensure the oil reservoir is full.

Several authors, including Chinn have stated that the improved M 07/12 was modified to fire without the need of lubricating the ammunition by incorporating a heavier bolt and a stronger spring; Firearms author Ian V. Hogg disputed this, writing that it was fitted with a larger oil reservoir and no production gun ever omitted the oiler. (Note: "It is sometimes stated that the latter Schwarzlose guns dispensed with the oil pump; this may have been a proposal, even the subject of a prototype, but no production gun was ever made without one.") Other authors have stated that the oil pump was replaced with an oiled pad, instead.

The Schwarzlose Model 1905, 1907, and 1908 all have a cyclic rate of about 400 rounds/minute. In the Model 1907/12, this was increased to 580 rounds/minute by using a stronger mainspring. The Schwarzlose was robust and reliable, if used in its intended role as an infantry weapon. It met with less success when it was used in roles it had not been designed for, unlike the highly adaptable Maxim-derived machine guns.

== Roles ==
=== Infantry and naval weapon ===
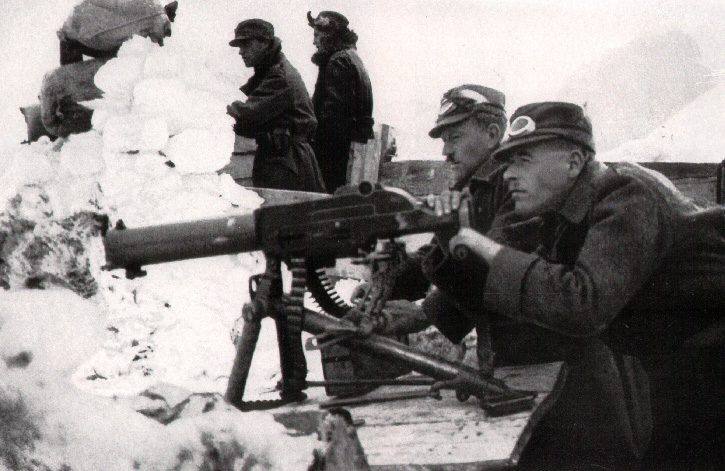
Austro-Hungarian machinegunners in the Tyrolean high mountains.

For infantry use, the Schwarzlose was usually employed as a traditional, tripod mounted, heavy machine gun served by a crew of at least three soldiers, one of whom was the commander, usually an NCO, a gunner who carried the weapon, a third soldier who served as an ammunition carrier and loader and he would presumably also carry the tripod although in practice a fourth soldier might be added to the team to carry the tripod. Another less commonly seen method of deployment was the more compact 'backpack mount'. In this configuration the gun was fitted with a backwards folding bipod attached to the front of the water jacket near the muzzle. The backpack mount itself consisted of a square wooden frame with a metal socket in the center. When the gun was fully deployed the frame was laid on the ground, the gun's central mounting point that usually attached to a tripod now had a small mounting pin attached to it instead which was inserted into the mounting socket in the center of the wooden backpack frame and finally the bipod was folded forward. The Schwarzlose would also have seen service as a fortress weapon in which case it would have been deployed on a variety of heavy and specialized fixed mountings and it also saw some use as a naval weapon aboard ships. During World War I, the Schwarzlose was also pressed into service as an anti-aircraft gun, and, as such, it was deployed using a variety of (often improvised) mountings.

=== Fortification weapon ===
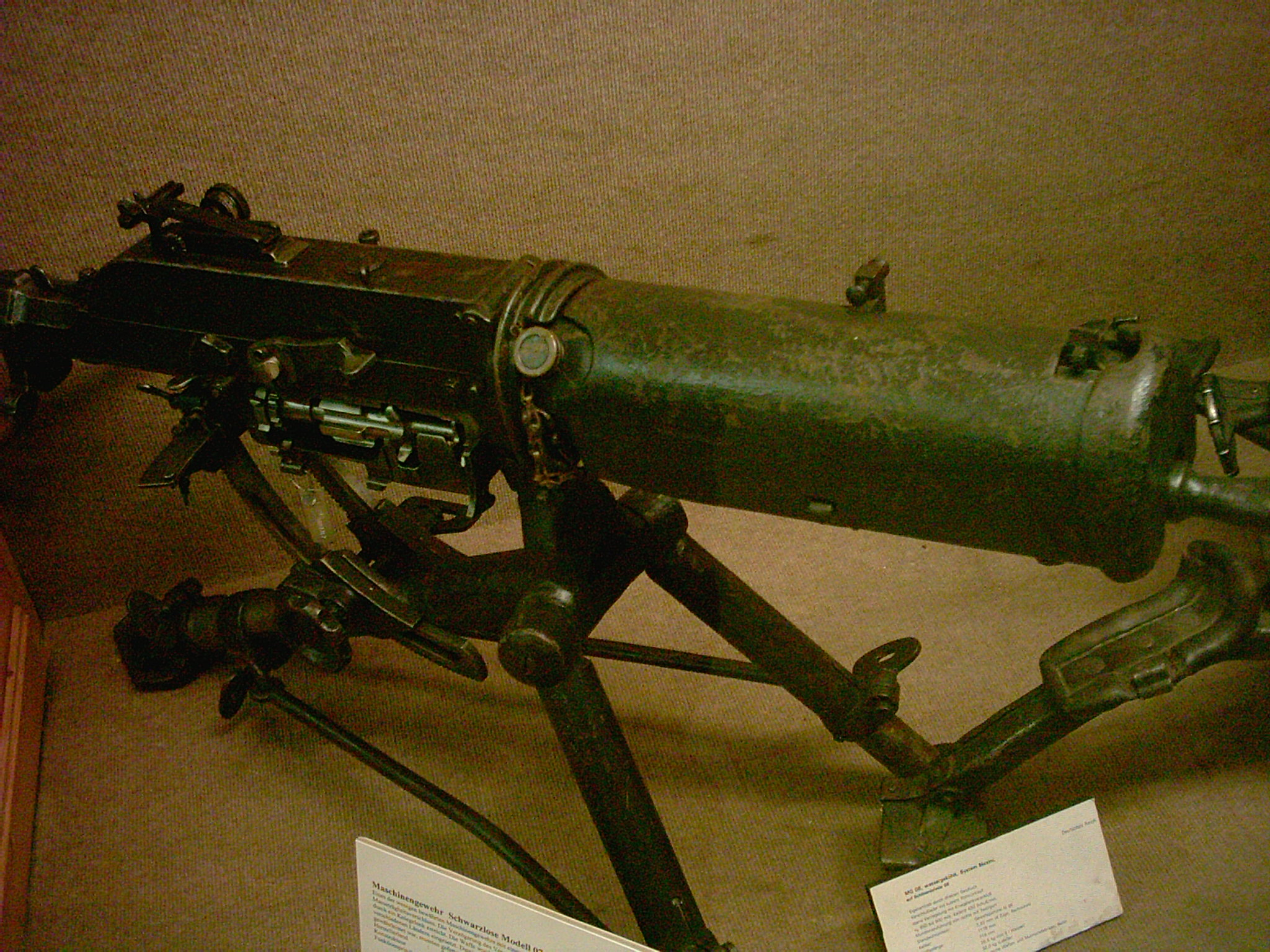
The 7/12 machine gun with water jacket cover.

After World War I the Schwarzlose equipped the armed forces of Czechoslovakia, where it was adapted (vz. 7/24) and manufactured (vz. 24) as the těžký kulomet vz. 7/24 (heavy machine gun model 7/24) by the Janeček factory (adapted from 8 mm calibre to standard Czechoslovak munition 7,92 Mauser). When Czechoslovakia started building fortifications against Nazi Germany in 1935-1938, light fortifications, known as types 36 and 37, were partially armed with the Schwarzlose vz. 7/24.

=== Aircraft gun ===
Apart from its use as a heavy infantry machine gun and as an anti-aircraft weapon, the Schwarzlose saw service with the Austro-Hungarian Luftfahrtruppe during World War I as an aircraft machine gun, a role for which it was not entirely suited. The Schwarzlose was used both as a fixed forward firing gun and as a flexible, ring mounted, defensive weapon.

Synchronizing the Schwarzlose for use in fighters turned out to be a difficult engineering challenge. A critical factor in synchronization is the time delay between the trigger movement and the moment when the bullet leaves the barrel, as during this delay the propeller will continue to rotate, moving over an angle that also varies with engine rpm. Because of the relatively long delay time of the Schwarzlose M7/12, the synchronization systems that were developed could be operated safely only in a narrow band of engine rpm. Therefore, the Austro-Hungarian fighters were equipped with large and prominent tachometers in the cockpit. The M16 version of the gun could be synchronized with greater accuracy, but a widened engine rpm restriction still had to be respected, except for aircraft equipped with Daimler synchronization gear. The result was never entirely satisfactory and Austro-Hungarian aircraft thus armed usually carried the Kravics indicator to warn the pilot of a malfunction in the synchronization gear. The Kravics propeller hit indicator consisted of electric wiring wrapped around the critical area of the propeller blades, connected to a light in the cockpit by a slip ring on the propeller shaft. If the light went out, the pilot knew the propeller had been hit.

Until these synchronization problems had been overcome, it was not uncommon to see the Schwarzlose deployed in a removable forward firing Type-II VK gun container which had been developed by the Luftfahrtruppe's Versuchs Kompanie at Fischamend. The Type-II VK, which received the macabre nickname 'baby coffin' due to its shape, is remarkable in that it was possibly the first example of what today would be called a gun pod. It was usually mounted on the centerline of the upper wing of Austro-Hungarian fighters and two-seat combat aircraft during the early phases of World War I and remained in use on two-seat combat aircraft until the end of the war. In its role as an aircraft weapon, the Schwarzlose was initially used unmodified — other than that the distinctive cone shaped flash-hider seen on most of the infantry weapons was removed. The Schwarzlose was further modified for aircraft use, much as the German Empire's own lMG 08 Spandau ordnance had been modified early in 1915, by cutting slots into the water jacket's sheetmetal to facilitate air cooling. In 1916, the water jacket was removed entirely, and the resulting weapon was re-designated as the Schwarzlose MG-16 and MG-16A when fitted with a stronger spring and a blowback enhancer to increase the gun's cyclic rate, which was eventually brought up to 880 rounds per minute in some versions of the MG-16A. As a defensive ring-mounted gun, the Schwarzlose usually retained its normal twin firing handles and trigger button, although some MG-16 aircraft guns were fitted with enlarged pistol-shaped handles and a handgun-style trigger. All ring-mounted defensive guns were equipped with specialized sights and a box for the ammunition belt, which allowed quick and trouble-free reloading. After the end of World War I, the Schwarzlose saw limited use as an aircraft gun with various East European air forces. The best-known post-war operator of the Schwarzlose was probably the Polish air force, who acquired and used significant numbers of surplus Austro-Hungarian aircraft and used them against Soviet forces during the Polish-Soviet War. The Schwarzlose was, however, quickly phased out of service as an aircraft weapon when more suitable equipment became available.

== Variants ==
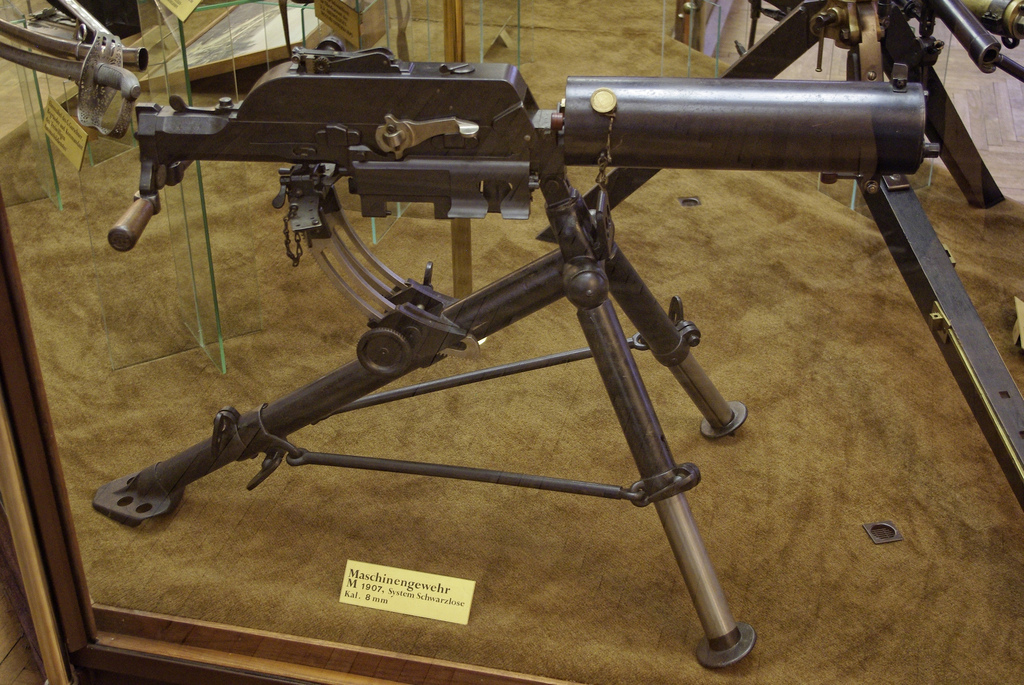
A Schwarzlose M07. Note the gap between the top cover and the water jacket

=== Austro-Hungarian ===
- M1905 – First production model made by Steyr
- M1907 – Adopted by the Austro-Hungarian Army in 8×50mmR Mannlicher, the oil tank could fire 2,000 rounds before needing a refill
- M1907/12 – Slightly improved version, with a slightly modified firing mechanism and strengthened parts, a redesigned receiver—closing the gap between the top cover and water jacket— and the oiler was kept. The fire rate was increased from 400 to 500 rounds per minute and the oil tank capacity was increased, allowing 4,500 rounds to be fired before refilling. Surviving guns were rechambered to the more powerful 8×56mmR cartridge, remaining in use with Austria until the Anschluss in 1938, while the Italians received a significant number of guns in their original caliber. The Germans designated captured Austrian and Italian M07/12s as the sMG 7/12(ö) and sMG 261(i) respectively
- M7/12/16 – A modified M07/12 fitted with a small tripod or a crude bipod and a shoulder stock; it was fed with special 100-round belts, similar to the German MG 08/15
- M16A – Air-cooled aircraft gun, the water jacket was removed, a large ammunition drum was fitted, and the rate of fire was increased to 880 rpm
- M1907/31 – Hungarian modification for the 8×56mmR cartridge

=== Foreign variants ===
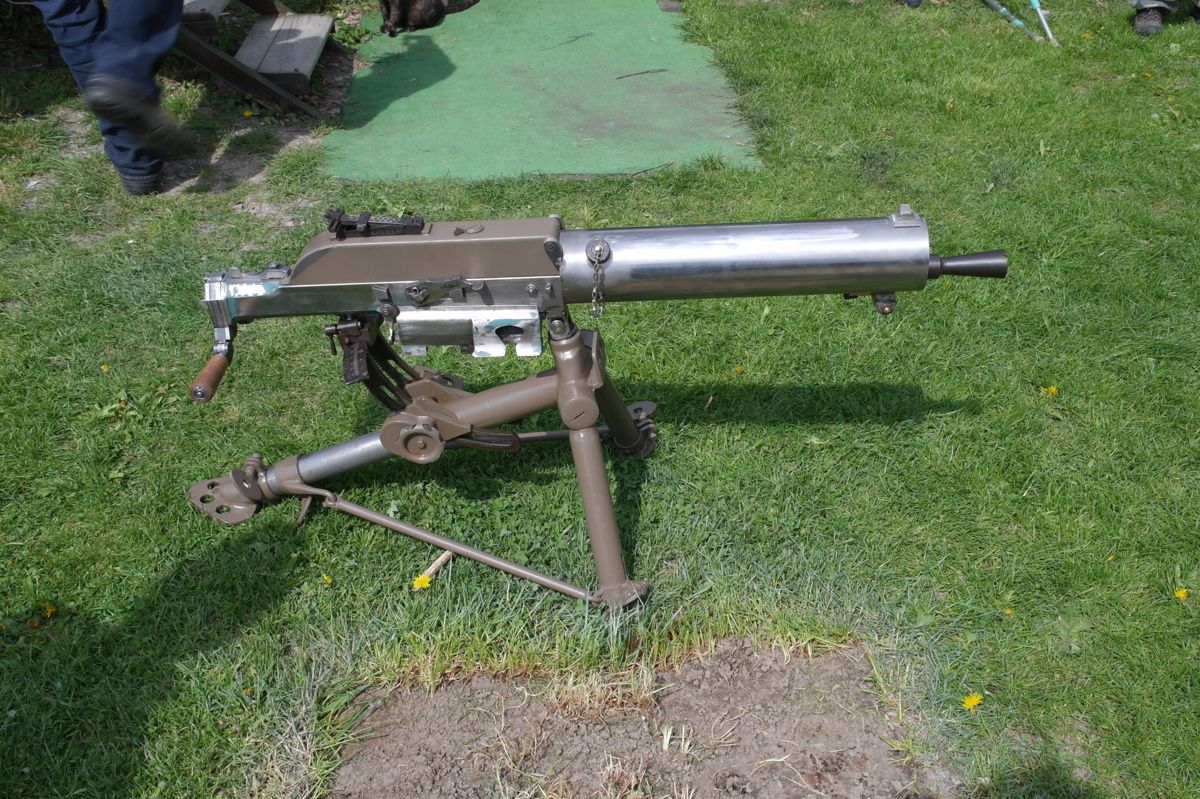
A M1924 on display at Smečno, Czech Republic

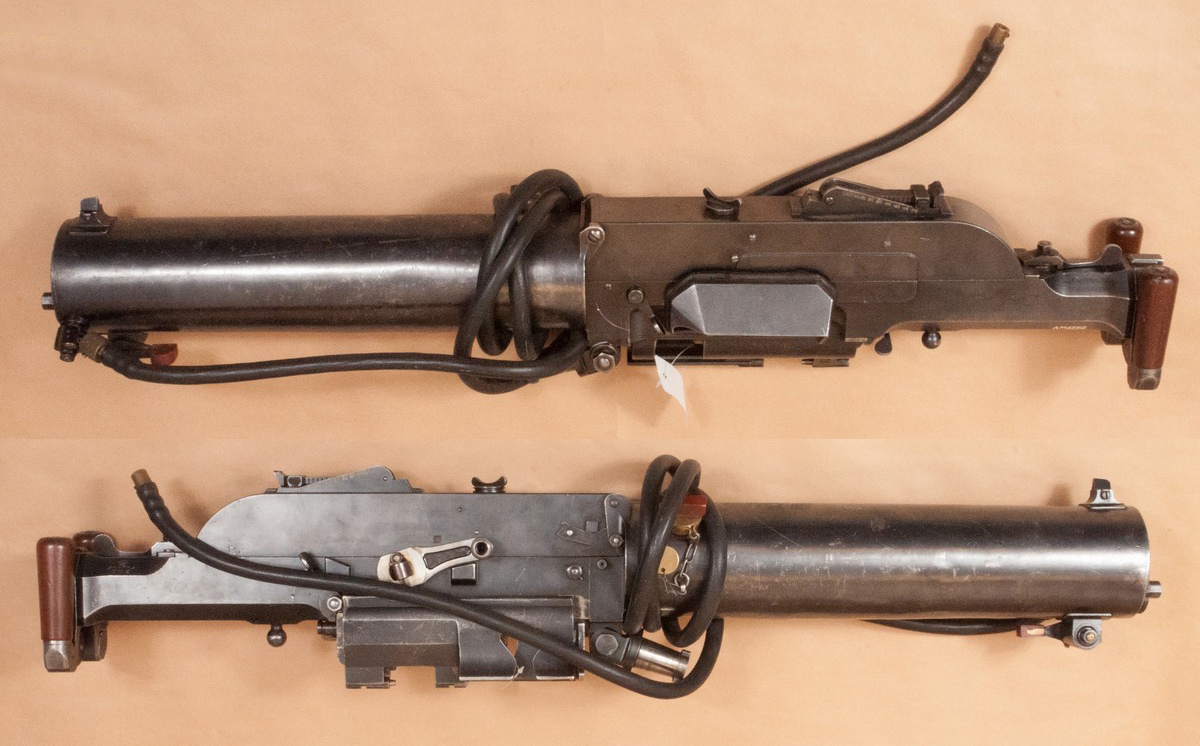
Ksp m/14 machine gun body

- M1907/24 – A Czechoslovak conversion of the M1907/12, it was fitted with a longer barrel and water jacket, while several old and worn out parts were replaced and the gun was rechambered to fire the more powerful 7.92×57mm Mauser cartridge, improving muzzle velocity and penetration
- M1924 – A designation used for newly made M1907/24s, it was produced until 1932 and exported in small numbers to Brazil, China, and Colombia
- M1908 – Export model for the Netherlands chambered in 6.5×53mmR. Captured guns during WWII were designated by the Germans as the sMG 241(h)
- M1908/13 – Export model of the M1907/12 for the Dutch. Captured guns during WWII were designated by the Germans as the sMG 242(h)
- M1908/15 – Dutch copy made under license; from 1925 onwards, it was produced in 7.92 mm caliber. Captured guns during WWII were designated by the Germans as the sMG 244(h)
- M1912 – Export model for Greece, it was chambered for the 6.5×54mm Mannlicher–Schönauer cartridge; Captured guns during WWII were designated by the Germans as the sMG 202(g)
- M1907/12S – Export model for Yugoslavia, chambered for the 7.92×57mm Mauser cartridge; Captured guns during WWII were designated by the Germans as the sMG 247(j)
- Kulspruta m/1914 – Swedish copy of the M07/12 produced under license by Carl Gustafs Stads Gevärsfaktori and chambered for the 6.5×55mm Swedish cartridge. 511 Ksp m/14s were delivered from Austria-Hungary before local production ran from 1917–1939
- Kynoch Machine Gun – A British copy of the Schwarzlose made by Kynoch in 1907
- Romanian M07/12 – 7.92×57mm Mauser conversion made by FN during the interwar period with a longer barrel and water jacket
- Sichuan-pattern Schwarzlose – Unlicensed Chinese copy made by the Sichuan Arsenal in 1918; in 1919 the caliber was changed from 8×56mmR Mannlicher to the 7.92×57mm Mauser
- Guandong-pattern Schwarzlose – Unlicensed Chinese copy produced by the Guandong Arsenal in the early 1920s

== Users ==
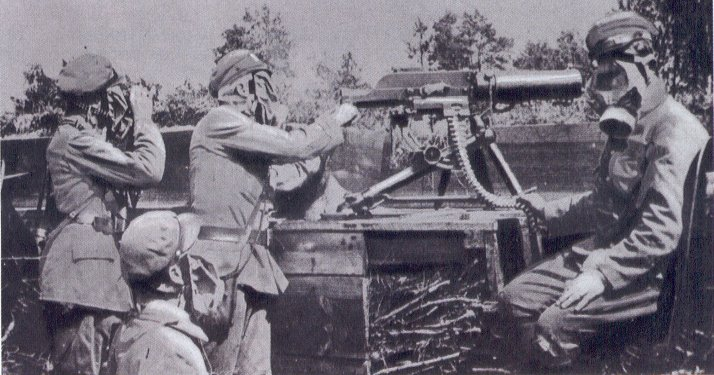
Brigade II of the Polish Legions of the Austria-Hungary in Volhynia, 1915 or 1916.

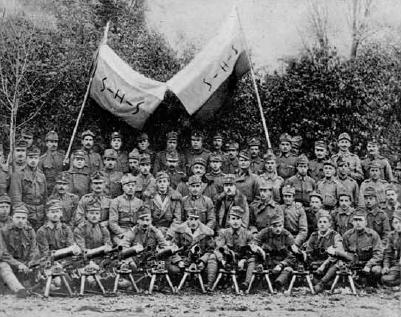
Slovene soldiers of the Austro-Hungarian Army posing with 9 Schwarzlose MGs, in a group photo, Tiraspol in 1918.

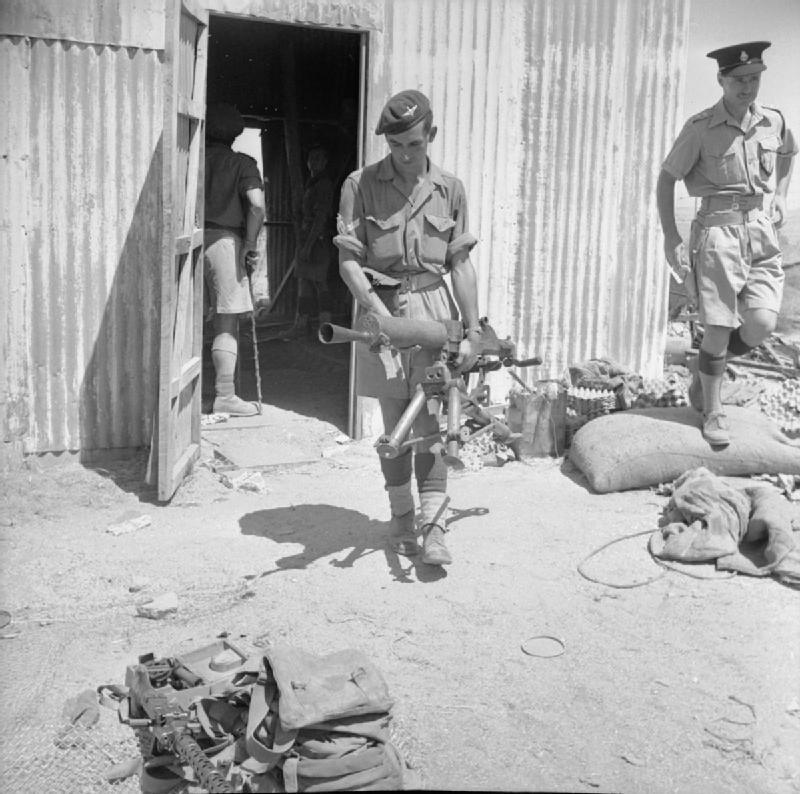
British soldiers seize a Schwarzlose machine gun from a Jewish weapons cache during the 1947–48 Civil War in Mandatory Palestine.

- Albania
- Austria-Hungary
- Austria
- Bulgaria
- Brazil − During the Constitutionalist revolution a number were imported from Czechoslosvakia by Governor Flores da Cunha of Rio Grande do Sul; these were later issued to the Military Brigade during the Campanha da Legalidade
- China – Produced unlicensed copies
- Colombia − Used in the Colombia–Peru War in 1933.
- Czechoslovakia
- Finland − Swedish Kulspruta m/1914 used by Swedish Volunteer Corps (SFK) during Winter War, a total of 70 guns used.
- Germany – Captured Austrian, Czechoslovak, Dutch, Greek, Italian, and Yugoslav guns
- Greece
- Hungary
- Italy − Received at least 900 from Austria-Hungary as reparations following the conclusion of WWI. Some were converted to 6.5mm Carcano. During WWII, they were issued to the 1st Army, 4th Army, and aerial defense units.
- Japan − 6.5mm Arisaka version was used by Imperial Japanese Navy during Inter-War Era. It was equipped on Fusō-class battleship and Kongō-class battlecruiser.
- Netherlands – Produced locally
- Ottoman Empire
- Poland
- Romania − Model 1907/12 in 8mm. Converted to 7.62×54mmR, metal belt feeding and fitted with a larger water jacket. Around 1,000 of these machine guns were converted to 7.92×57mm Mauser by FN Herstal and remained in service during World War II with the border guards and marines, and occasionally as anti-aircraft guns (although a different source said that these converted saw little to no use during the war, and were brought to the United States after 1968).
- Russian Empire
- Serbia
- Spain
- Sweden – Produced locally
- Yugoslavia – Model 1907/12 (adopted as the Mitraljez 7,92 mm M.07/12S), chambered in 8mm Mauser.
  - Yugoslav Partisans – Used in World War II.
- Jewish partisans – Used during the 1947–48 Civil War in Mandatory Palestine.
