= Matsuoka =

- Pronunciation: Japanese: [matsɯꜜoka]
- Language: Japanese

Origin
- Meaning: Matsu (松) : Pine tree Oka (岡) : Hill
- Region of origin: Japan

Matsuoka (written: 松岡 or 松丘 lit. "pine tree hill") is a Japanese surname.

Matsuoka is the 142nd most common name in Japan as of 2024, belonging to approximately 1 out of 865 people, or 137,000 individuals. It is most prevalent in Osaka, with the highest percentage per capita in Kochi and Kumamoto prefectures.

It is believed that the name either originated from descendants of kannushi families, as hills of pines were often considered sacred and the location of many Shinto shrines, such as the descendants of Matsuoka Masanao at the Atsuta Shrine, or simply that individuals lived near a pine hill, sacred or otherwise.

Popular kamon associated with the name include Three Pine Trees in a Circle (丸に三階松), Three Oxalis leaves with Swords (剣片喰), Two Lines in a Circle (丸に二つ引両), and Oak leaves and Vines in a Snowflake (丸に蔓柏) help illustrate the diversity of various lines and their associations with bigger clans.

Notable people with the surname include:

(Names are listed by field, alphabetically by given name in the western convention of given-name, surname for clarity.)

== Academics ==
- Asa Matsuoka (松岡朝; 1893–1980), Japanese philanthropist and cultural ambassador
- Hiroyuki Matsuoka (born c. 1956), Japanese professor of infection and immunity
- Kinpei Matsuoka (松岡 均平; 1876–1960), Japanese baron and economics professor
- Kunio Matsuoka (松岡 國男; 1875–1962), birth name of Kunio Yanagita, Japanese scholar and folklorist
- Satoshi Matsuoka (松岡 聡; born 1964), Japanese computer scientist
- Shinpei Matsuoka (松岡心平; born 1954), Japanese noh scholar
- Shizuo Matsuoka (松岡 静雄; 1878–1936), Japanese naval officer, linguist, and ethnologist
- Shoan Matsuoka (松岡 恕庵; 1668-1756) Japanese Confucianist and herbalist
- Yoko Matsuoka McClain (1924–2011), Japanese-born American professor of language and literature
- Yoky Matsuoka (born 1972), American computer scientist

== Arts and entertainment ==
- Aya Matsuoka (松岡 彩), Japanese musician
- Hisashi Matsuoka (松岡 寿; 1862–1944), Japanese painter
- Isao Matsuoka (松岡 功; born 1934), Japanese film studio executive
- Joji Matsuoka (松岡 錠司; born 1961), Japanese film director
- Katsuyoshi Matsuoka (松岡 克由; 1935–2011), Japanese rakugoka known as Danshi Tatekawa
- Keika Matsuoka (松岡 桂花), Japanese musician
- Keisuke Matsuoka (松岡 圭祐; born 1968), Japanese mystery writer
- Kenichiro Matsuoka (松岡 謙一郎; 1914–1994), Japanese television executive
- Kent Matsuoka (born 1974), American film producer
- Kikko Matsuoka (松岡 きっこ; born 1947), Japanese actress
- Linah Matsuoka (松岡 李那; born 1986), Japanese actress and musician
- Masahiro Matsuoka (松岡 昌宏; born 1977), Japanese actor and musician
- Mayu Matsuoka (松岡 茉優; born 1995), Japanese actress
- Mei Matsuoka (born 1981), Japanese-English illustrator and writer
- Mitsuru Matsuoka (松岡充; born 1971), Japanese musician
- Mona Matsuoka (born 1998), American fashion model
- Natsumi Matsuoka (松岡 菜摘; born 1996), Japanese musician
- Takashi Matsuoka (born 1954), American writer
- Yōko Matsuoka (松岡 洋子; born 1954), Japanese voice actress
- Yoko Matsuoka (writer) (松岡洋子; 1916-1979), Japanese writer
- Yoshitsugu Matsuoka (松岡 禎丞; born 1986), Japanese voice actor
- Yuki Matsuoka (松岡 由貴; born 1970), Japanese voice actor
- Yuko Matsuoka (松丘 夕子; born 1977), better known as Aka Plu, Japanese comedian

== Politics ==
- Bankichi Matsuoka (松岡 磐吉; 1841–1871), Japanese Bakufu loyalist
- Hiroko Matsuoka (松岡 博子; 1907–1987), Japanese wife of Eisaku Satō
- Junkichi Matsuoka (松岡潤吉; 1888-1951), Japanese politician and businessman
- Komakichi Matsuoka (松岡駒吉; 1888-1958), Japanese politician and labor activist
- Tamaki Matsuoka (松岡 環; born 1947), Japanese political activist
- Toru Matsuoka (松岡 徹; born 1951), Japanese politician
- Toshikatsu Matsuoka (松岡 利勝; 1945–2007), Japanese politician
- Toshizo Matsuoka (松岡 俊三; 1880-1955), Japanese politician
- Yasutake Matsuoka (松岡 康毅; 1846–1923), Japanese baron and politician
- Yōsuke Matsuoka (松岡 洋右; 1880–1946), Japanese diplomat and politician

== Sports and martial arts ==
- Akiyoshi Matsuoka (松岡 昭義; born 1945), Japanese cross-country skier
- Daichi Matsuoka (松岡 大智; born 1999), Japanese footballer
- Daiki Matsuoka (松岡 大起; born 2001), Japanese footballer
- Hiromu Matsuoka (松岡 弘; born 1947), Japanese baseball player
- Jitsuka Matsuoka (松岡 実和; born 1933), Japanese sport shooter
- Katsunosuke Matsuoka (松岡 克之助; 1836–1898), Japanese martial arts master
- Kenichi Matsuoka (松岡 健一; born 1982), Japanese baseball player
- Miho Matsuoka (松岡 美保; born 1953), Japanese women's basketball player
- Rie Matsuoka (松岡 理恵; born 1977), Japanese long-distance runner
- Rimu Matsuoka (松岡 瑠夢; born 1998), Japanese footballer
- Ryosuke Matsuoka (松岡 亮輔; born 1984), Japanese footballer
- Shuzo Matsuoka (松岡 修造; born 1967), Japanese tennis player
- Yasunobu Matsuoka (松岡 康暢; born 1986), Japanese footballer
- Yoshihiko Matsuoka (松岡 良彦; born 1977), Japanese footballer
- Yoshiyuki Matsuoka (松岡 義之; born 1957), Japanese judoka
- Yuta Matsuoka (松岡 祐太; born 1989), Japanese volleyball player

== Others ==
- Hideki Matsuoka (松岡 秀樹; born 1968), Japanese Go player
- Masanao Matsuoka (松岡 正直), Japanese Shinto priest
- Peter Magoshiro Matsuoka (ペトロ 松岡 孫四郎; 1887—1980) Japanese Catholic Bishop
- Ryoji Matsuoka (松岡 良治; died 2012) Japanese guitar maker
- Seijiro Matsuoka (松岡 地所; 1894-1989) Japanese entrepreneur and philanthropist
- Sōyū Matsuoka (松岡 操雄; 1912–1997), Japanese Zen Buddhist teacher
- Yoshio Matsuoka (松岡 義雄; born c. 1940), Japanese mob boss

== Fictional characters ==
- Kenjiro Matsuoka, a character in the video game Killer7
- Miu Matsuoka (松岡 美羽), a character in the manga and anime series Strawberry Marshmallow
- Rin Matsuoka (松岡 凛), a character in the anime series Free!
