= Hiro Matsuoka =

Japanese businessman (born 1966)

- 松岡 宏泰
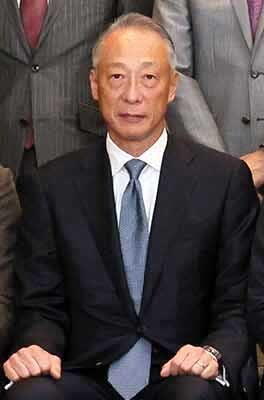
- Matsuoka at the Prime Minister's Office in September 2024
- Born: Hiroyasu Matsuoka; April 18, 1966 (age 60); Rome, Italy
- Citizenship: Japan
- Education: Keio University; University of Pittsburgh (MBA)
- Occupation: Businessman
- Years active: 1992–present
- Organization: Toho Co., Ltd.
- Title: Representative Director, President and CEO of Toho Co., Ltd. (2022–present); Chairman of Toho-Towa Co., Ltd. (2015–present); Part-time Director of Kansai Television; Part-time Director of BS Fuji; Councilor of the Kawakita Memorial Film Institute
- Father: Isao Matsuoka
- Relatives: Shuzo Matsuoka (younger brother)

Hiroyasu "Hiro" Matsuoka (松岡 宏泰, Matsuoka Hiroyasu; born April 18, 1966) is a Japanese businessman. He has served as Representative Director, President, and CEO of Toho Co., Ltd. since May 2022, becoming the 15th person to hold the position.

== Early life ==
Hiroyasu Matsuoka was born on April 18, 1966, in Rome, Italy, while his father, Isao Matsuoka (later the 11th president and current honorary chairman of Toho), was stationed at the company's European office there. He is Isao's eldest son and the middle child. He belongs to the prominent Matsuoka family, which has deep historical ties to the Hankyu Hanshin Toho Group through intermarriage with the Kobayashi family, founders of the Hankyu empire and originators of the Takarazuka Revue.

Matsuoka was educated entirely within the Keio Gijuku system, attending Keio Yochisha Elementary School, Keio Junior High School, Keio Senior High School, and graduating from the Faculty of Law at Keio University in 1989. During university he was heavily involved in the tennis club of the Athletic Association, later reflecting that his half-hearted commitment to the sport during those years taught him the importance of full dedication in professional life. After graduation he studied in the United States, earning a degree in business administration from Albright College in 1991 and an MBA from the University of Pittsburgh Graduate School of Business in July 1992. While abroad he occasionally supported his younger brother Shuzo, then a professional tennis player, during tournament tours.

== Career ==
In 1992, Matsuoka entered the film industry by joining the prominent Hollywood talent agency International Creative Management (ICM), where he started in an entry-level role and gained valuable insight into the workings of the American entertainment business. He returned to Japan in 1994 and joined Toho-Towa, Toho's international distribution and co-production arm. He progressed steadily at Toho-Towa, becoming a director in 1998, president in 2008, and chairman in 2015. At the parent company, he was appointed a director of Toho in 2014, managing director in 2018, and managing executive officer in 2021, with responsibility for film planning, coordination, and international strategy.

On May 26, 2022, Matsuoka was named the 15th president and CEO of Toho Co., Ltd., succeeding Yoshishige Shimatani. Since taking the helm, he has driven the company's "TOHO VISION 2032" long-term strategy, which focuses on significantly expanding international revenue through stronger IP development, direct global distribution, strategic acquisitions, and new overseas operations. He has executive-produced several major international projects, including collaborations with Hollywood studios and the Apple TV+ series Monarch: Legacy of Monsters. He also has personal connections in the international film industry and is a friend of actor Tom Cruise.

Matsuoka holds Japanese citizenship and is professionally known as Hiro Matsuoka in English-language media, international business contexts, and on Toho's official English-language website. He also speaks fluent English.

== Family tree ==
MATSUOKA (松岡) Family Tree

MATSUOKA Jiemon; Ojoya of Arima
BABA Sanemon; Ibaraki Bank	MATSUOKA Shuzo; Matsuoka Kisen (1859-1929)	TANABE Shichibei; Sake Brewer
MATSUOKA Junkichi (Baba Keizo); House of Peers (1888–1951)	MATSUOKA Chieko	KOBAYASHI Ichizō; Hankyu Railways (1873–1957)	TANABE Shichiroku (half-brother); House of Representatives (1879-1952)	TANABE Munehide (half-brother); Nippon Television (1881-1957)
MATSUOKA Setsuko	MATSUOKA Tatsuo (Kobayashi); Toho Co. (1904-1974)	KOBAYASHI Yonezo; Keihanshin Railway (1909-1969)	KOBAYASHI Haruko (Married TORII Kichitaro) (1912-2011)
SHIZUKA Chinami; Takarazuka Revue	MATSUOKA Isao; Toho Co. (1934-)	KOBAYASHI Kimiko (Husband Kohei adopted by Yonezo)	TORII Shinichi; Suntory (1938–2004)
TSUJI Toshiko (Married TSUJI Yoshiki)	MATSUOKA Hiroyasu; Toho Co. (1966-)	MATSUOKA Shuzo; Tennis Pro (1967-)	TAGUCHI Emiko; TV presenter (1966-)
TSUJI Takayasu (1995-); Rugby Pro	KISHOU Kazuto; Takarazuka Revue

== Links ==
- Hiroyasu Matsuoka at IMDb
- Hiro Matsuoka at IMDb
