= Matsuoka (disambiguation) =

Matsuoka (松岡) is a Japanese surname.

Matsuoka may also refer to:

- Matsuoka, Fukui, a former town (町 chō) in what is now Eiheiji, Fukui Prefecture, Japan
- Matsuoka Domain, a former domain (藩 han) in what is now Takahagi, Ibaraki Prefecture, Japan
- Matsuoka Museum of Art, a private museum located in Shirokanedai, Minato, Tokyo, Japan
- Matsuoka Station, an Echizen Railway Katsuyama Eiheiji Line railway station located in Eiheiji, Fukui Prefecture, Japan.
