= Doraemon: Nobita's Earth Symphony =

2024 film by Kazuki İmai

Doraemon the Movie: Nobita's Earth Symphony
- Theatrical release poster

Japanese name
- Kanji: 映画ドラえもん のび太の地球交響楽
Transcriptions
- Revised Hepburn: Riga Doraemon Nobita no Chikyū Shinfonī
- Directed by: Kazuaki Imai
- Screenplay by: Teruko Utsumi
- Based on: Doraemon by Fujiko F. Fujio
- Starring: Wasabi Mizuta; Megumi Ohara; Yumi Kakazu; Subaru Kimura; Tomokazu Seki; Kyoko Yoshine; Riana Hirano; Kokoro Kikuchi; Kōji Kikkawa; Kanji Ishimaru
- Music by: Takayuki Hattori
- Production company: Shin-Ei Animation
- Distributed by: Toho
- Release date: 1 March 2024
- Running time: 115 minutes
- Country: Japan
- Language: Japanese
- Box office: $46.70 million

Doraemon the Movie: Nobita's Earth Symphony (映画ドラえもん のび太の地球交響楽, Eiga Doraemon Nobita no Chikyū Shinfonī) is a 2024 Japanese animated musical science fantasy adventure film. It is the 43rd Doraemon feature film. Directed by Kazuaki Imai from a screenplay by Teruko Utsumi, it was released theatrically in Japan on March 1, 2024.

== Plot ==
In class, Nobita and the others are practicing their recorders for an autumn recital, but Nobita plays his instrument badly, leading to ridicule from his friends, Gian and Suneo. To avoid practice, Nobita steals a gadget from Doraemon that allows future events in a diary to occur. Nobita wishes for no music for tomorrow to skip music class, but inadvertently results in many people unable to perform music. Doraemon reverts the damage and asks Nobita to practice his recorder without a gadget.

While practicing their recorders near a riverbank, Nobita and his friends stumbles upon a mysterious girl who joins them in performing a concert. She invites them onto a floating spacecraft, the Grand Hall of Farre, where she introduces herself as Mikka, and her robot assistant Chappeku. Mikka and her friends, who hail from the planet Mushka, have waited for a group called the Virtuosos to revive their spacecraft with music (called farre). Doraemon grants everyone their respective instruments to play: Gian gets the tuba, Suneo the violin, Shizuka the bongo, and Nobita the recorder. Along the way the group revitalize the spacecraft with their musical performance, although Nobita continues to struggle playing his recorder.

Gian and Suneo end up distracted by a building playing terrible music. They enter, finding a mysterious black entity called the Noise interfering with a conductor's machine to playing music. Gian and Suneo try to exterminate the creatures by playing their music, but they're ineffective against the combined giant entity, and they flee. They regroup with the rest of Nobita's friend, having to go back home on Earth to finish attending school. Later that night, Nobita practices his recorder skills in his echoey bathroom.

Entering the center of the Grand Hall of Farre the next day, the group finds Ventoux, Chapek's teacher and maestro. He tells Nobita and the others that the planet of Mushka was consumed by the Noise after private musical performances were banned. Nobita then realizes that his temporary stop of music is what attracted the Noise to Earth in the first place. In order to save Earth from the Noise, the group obtains the whistle of Mushka. Micka tries to play the whistle but realizes that a few of her notes are missing. However Nobita's recorder mishaps fill in the last notes needed to power the Grand Hall of Farre.

With the spacecraft fully operational, Nobita's friends and the other Mushka musicians play a music composed by Chapek known as "Earth Symphony" to battle Noise. However, Noise flings Nobita and the others into outer space, where he realizes that no one can hear in outer space. However, a gadget by Doraemon that changes space and time activates by accident, causing a parameter of Earth to be within the confines of Nobita's bathroom. With this, the group, along with the rest of Earth, successfully defeat Noise.

Nobita and his friends bid farewell to Mikka and the residents of the Grand Hall of Farre. Chapek later informs Micka that their performance signaled another nearby ship of dislocated Mushka people their location. Meanwhile, Nobita and the others play their recorders at the autumn recital, with Nobita playing his instrument better than before.

== Cast ==
Character	Japanese voice actor
Doraemon	Wasabi Mizuta
Nobita Nobi	Megumi Ōhara
Shizuka Minamoto	Yumi Kakazu
Takeshi "Gian" Gōda	Subaru Kimura
Suneo Honekawa	Tomokazu Seki
Miina	Kyoko Yoshine
Mikka	Riana Hirano
Chappeku	Kokoro Kikuchi
Maestro Vento	Kōji Kikkawa
Wakner	Kanji Ishimaru
Mozzel	Mutsumi Tamura
Takiren	Chō
Music Teacher; ParoParo	Aoi Yūki
Tamako Nobi (Nobita's mother)	Kotono Mitsuishi
Nobisuke Nobi (Nobita's father)	Yasunori Matsumoto
Teacher	Wataru Takagi
Hidetoshi Dekisugi	Shihoko Hagino

== Staff ==
- Original: Fujiko F. Fujio
- Director: Kazuaki Imai
- Screenplay: Teruko Utsumi
- Music: Takayuki Hattori
- Production companies: Shin-Ei Animation, TV Asahi and ADK

== Soundtrack ==
The theme song is "Time Paradox" by Vaundy.

== Production ==
=== Scenario setting ===
Kazuaki Imai stated that he got the idea for the story of the film during the lockdown period of the COVID-19 pandemic. He said, "When I finished directing my previous work "New Dinosaur," the world had changed in an unexpected way due to the pandemic caused by the novel coronavirus. Children were more stressed when the human nature of direct contact and interaction was restricted. One day, I felt emotional when I saw my son, who was stuck at home, singing loudly while watching TV. It was a programme that connected each performer remotely and performed one song while the concert could not be held. At the same time as I was struck by the power of music, the image of children going on a big adventure in the world of music with Doraemon began to swell in my head."

== Reception ==
=== Box office ===
At the box office, Doraemon the Movie: Nobita's Earth Symphony made $4,366,266 on its opening day and grossed $46,704,773 worldwide. The film grossed ¥4.31 billion ($27.42 million) in Japan, making it the ninth highest-grossing domestic film of 2024.

== See also ==
- List of Doraemon films
