= 2004 Niigata gubernatorial election =

Election to determine the governor of Niigata, Japan

← 2000	14 October 2004	2008 →
- Turnout: 53.88 ▼9.71
Governor before election
Yukio Hirayama
LDP
Elected Governor
Hirohiko Izumida
LDP

A gubernatorial election was held on 14 October 2004 to elect the next governor of Niigata (山口県, Niigata-ken), a prefecture of Japan in the Chūbu region of the main island of Honshu.

The incumbent, elected since 1992, Yukio Hirayama, 60, does not run again.

== Candidates ==
- Hirohiko Izumida, 42, endorsed by LDP and NK.
- Hidetoshi Taga, 54, backed by SDP and the local chapter of DPJ.
- Ichizo Kobayashi, 68, former chief of the Urban Development Bureau of the Niigata prefecture, member of LDP.
- Yukio Kawamata, 49, backed by the JCP.
- Kaoru Miyakoshi, 63, bureaucrat in the Finance Ministry, former JRP militant.
- Yuji Ito, 39.

== Results ==
Niigata gubernatorial 2018
Party	Candidate	Votes	%	±%
LDP	Hirohiko Izumida	344,904	33.16	▼22.78
Social Democratic	Hidetoshi Taga	299,145	28.76	n/a
LDP	Ichizo Kobayashi	198,675	19.10	▼17.05
	Kaoru Miyakoshi	109,539	10.53	n/a
JCP	Yukio Kawamata	46,207	4.44	▼3.48
	Yuji Ito	41,626	4.00	n/a
Total valid votes		1,040,096	97.88	
Turnout		1,062,672	55.88	▼9.71
Registered electors		1,972,144		
LDP hold		Swing	4.40	
