= Masuoka =

Masuoka (written: 増岡 or 舛岡) is a Japanese surname. Notable people with the surname include:

- Fujio Masuoka (舛岡 富士雄, born 1943), Japanese engineer
- Hiroshi Masuoka (rally driver) (増岡 浩, born 1960), Japanese rally driver
- Hiroshi Masuoka (voice actor) (増岡 弘, born 1936), Japanese voice actor

== See also ==
- Matsuoka
