= 2000 Niigata gubernatorial election =

← 1996	22 October 2000	2004 →
- Turnout: 63.59 ▼5.69
Governor before election
Yukio Hirayama
LDP
Elected Governor
Yukio Hirayama
LDP

A gubernatorial election was held on 22 October 2000 to elect the next governor of Niigata (山口県, Niigata-ken), a prefecture of Japan in the Chūbu region of the main island of Honshu.

== Candidates ==
- Yukio Hirayama, 56, incumbent since 1992, endorsed by LDP, DPJ, NK, LP and SDP.
- Ichizo Kobayashi, 64, former chief of the Urban Development Bureau of the Niigata prefecture.
- Shouji Tagashi, backed by the JCP.

== Results ==
Niigata gubernatorial 2018
Party	Candidate	Votes	%	±%
LDP	Yukio Hirayama *	691,849	55.94	▼25.94
LDP	Ichizo Kobayashi	447,089	36.15	n/a
JCP	Shouji Tagashi	97,932	7.92	▼10.20
Total valid votes		1,236,870	99.23	
Turnout		1,246,442	63.59 ▼5.69	
Registered electors		1,960,148		
LDP hold		Swing	19.79	

== See also ==
- 新潟県知事一覧|新潟県知事一覧|新潟県知事一覧 (Japanese Wikipedia)
