= Isao Matsuoka =

Japanese businessman

Isao Matsuoka 松岡 功
- Born: December 18, 1934 (age 91); Hyōgo, Japan
- Education: Konan University
- Occupation: Media Executive
- Organization: Toho Co., Ltd.
- Title: Kaichō
- Spouse: Chinami Shizuka
- Children: Hiroyasu Matsuoka; Shuzo Matsuoka
- Parent(s): Tatsuro (Kobayashi); Setsuko Matsuoka

Isao Matsuoka (松岡 功, Matsuoka Isao; born December 18, 1934) is a longtime studio executive and former chairman of Toho Co., Ltd., serving as Chairman for 14 years until his retirement in 2009. He had previously served as President and worked for the company for over 50 years having joined in 1957.

He currently serves as chairman emeritus of Toho, honorary chairman of the Japan Academy Film Prize Association, and a director of the Kawakita Memorial Film Foundation.

Isao's father, Tatsuro Matsuoka (Kobayashi), was the second son of Toho founder Ichizō Kobayashi, and as such, was adopted into the Matsuoka family upon his marriage to Setsuko Matsuoka, daughter of Ichizō's business partner and member of Diet, Junkichi Matsuoka. Tatsuro also served as Toho's president following the death of his older brother Fusao.

A graduate of the prestigious Konan University, Isao is credited with helping establish Toho as the preeminent film production, distribution and exhibition company in Japan with his revolutionary and innovative reforms following his promotion to president in 1977, and named as the 10th most powerful person in the Japanese film industry by Première Magazine Japan in 2001. Established in 1932, Toho is known internationally for its Godzilla series and the Akira Kurosawa classics Kagemusha and Ran produced under Matsuoka's leadership.

Isao has also been honored with Lifetime Achievement Awards by CineAsia in 1998 and the National Association of Theatre Owners at ShoWest in 2007, the FIAPF Award for outstanding achievement in film at the 2009 Asia Pacific Screen Awards, and the Special Merit Award by the Japan Association of Theatre Owners on 2015.

Born in Ashiya, Hyōgo, Isao played tennis at university and represented Japan in the 1956 Davis Cup. He married Chinami Shizuka, a star of the Takarazuka Revue, with whom he had 2 sons, Hiroyasu Matsuoka, who followed his father into the film business and succeeded Isao to serve as the 15th President and CEO of Toho in 2022, and Shuzo Matsuoka, a former professional tennis player and current sports commentator.

== Family tree ==
MATSUOKA (松岡) Family Tree

MATSUOKA Jiemon; Ojoya of Arima
BABA Sanemon; Ibaraki Bank	MATSUOKA Shuzo; Matsuoka Kisen (1859-1929)	KOBAYASHI Ikuko (died ~1873)	TANABE Shichibei (adopted into TANABE family); Sake Brewer (1848-??)	TANABE
MATSUOKA Junkichi (Baba Keizo); House of Peers (1888–1951)	MATSUOKA Chieko	KOBAYASHI Ichizō; Hankyu Railways (1873–1957)	TANABE Shichiroku; House of Representatives (1879-1952)	TORII Shinjiro; Founder of Suntory (1879–1962)
MATSUOKA Setsuko	MATSUOKA Tatsuo (Kobayashi); Toho Co. (1904-1974)	KOBAYASHI Yonezo; Keihanshin Railway (1909-1969)	KOBAYASHI Haruko (Married TORII Kichitaro) (1912-2011)	Kichitarō Torii (1908-1940)
SHIZUKA Chinami; Takarazuka Revue	MATSUOKA Isao; Toho Co. (1934-)	KOBAYASHI Kimiko (Husband Kohei adopted by Yonezo)	TORII Shinichi; Suntory (1938–2004)
TSUJI Toshiko (Married TSUJI Yoshiki)	MATSUOKA Hiroyasu; Toho Co. (1966-)	MATSUOKA Shuzo; Tennis Pro (1967-)	TAGUCHI Emiko; TV presenter (1966-)
TSUJI Takayasu (1995-); Rugby Pro	KISHOU Kazuto; Takarazuka Revue
