= Riana Hirano =

Japanese child actress (born 2011)

- 平野 莉亜菜
- Born: May 8, 2011 (age 15); Shizuoka Prefecture, Japan
- Occupation: Child actress
- Years active: 2022–present
- Agent: Toho
- Known for: Doraemon: Nobita's Earth Symphony as Mikka
- Website: Official profile

Riana Hirano (平野 莉亜菜, Hirano Riana; born May 8, 2011) is a Japanese child actress from Shizuoka Prefecture.

A finalist of the 9th Toho Cinderella Audition, she is most well known for her role as Mikka in the Doraemon feature film Doraemon: Nobita's Earth Symphony.

== Biography ==
Hirano was born in Shizuoka Prefecture, Japan on May 8, 2011.

At the 9th Toho Cinderella Audition held in 2022, film director Kazuaki Imai, watching the audition, recognized her talent which lead to her being cast as the voice of Mikka in the Doraemon feature film Doraemon: Nobita's Earth Symphony, marking her debut in the entertainment industry.

== Awards ==
| Year | Award | Category | Result | Ref. |
|---|---|---|---|---|
| 2022 | 9th Toho Cinderella Audition | Finalist | Honored | |

== Filmography ==
=== Feature films ===
List of performances in feature films
| Year | Title | Role | Notes | Source |
|---|---|---|---|---|
| 2025 | Sham | Additional role | | |

=== Theatrical animation ===
List of voice performances in theatrical animation
| Year | Title | Role | Notes | Source |
|---|---|---|---|---|
| 2024 | Doraemon: Nobita's Earth Symphony | Mikka | Debut acting role | |

=== Television programs ===
List of performances in television programs
| Year | Title | Role | Notes | Source |
|---|---|---|---|---|
| 2024 | Untitled Concert | Appearance | | |
