= FIAPF Award =

The FIAPF Award is awarded by the International Federation of Film Producers Associations (FIAPF) for an outstanding achievement in film in the Asia-Pacific region. The winners of this award are

- 2007: Dr. George (Miliotis) Miller - Australia
- 2008: Yash Raj Chopra - India
- 2009: Isao Matsuoka - Japan
- 2010: Christine Hakim - Indonesia
- 2011: Zhang Yimou - Peoples's Republic of China
- 2012: Ryuichi Sakamoto - Japan
- 2013: Lee Choon-yun - Republic of Korea
- 2014: Emile Sherman - Australia
- 2015: Esaad Younis - Egypt
- 2016: Manoochehr Mohammadi - Islamic Republic of Iran
- 2017: Bianca Balbuena - Philippines
- 2018: Nandita Das - India
- 2019: Katriel Schory - Israel
- 2020: Soros Sukhum - Thailand
- 2021: Sergey Selyanov - Russian Federation
- 2022: Nadine Labaki - Lebanon
