= Kanji Ishimaru =

Japanese musical actor and singer (born 1965)

- 石丸 幹二
- Born: 15 August 1965 (age 61); Niihama, Ehime, Japan
- Education: Tokyo University of the Arts
- Occupations: Actor; singer
- Years active: 1990–present
- Agent: The Library
- Television: Hanzawa Naoki; Roosevelt Game; Hana Moyu
- Awards: 37th Kazuo Kikuta Theater Awards Theater Prize
- Website: thelibrary-pastorale.com

Kanji Ishimaru (石丸 幹二, Ishimaru Kanji; born 15 August 1965 in Niihama, Ehime) is a Japanese musical actor and singer. Ishimaru is signed to Sony Music Entertainment Japan. He grew up in Ichihara, Chiba and graduated from Tokyo University of the Arts.

== Biography ==
Ishimaru played various instruments, such as the piano, cello, trombone, and snare drum, since childhood. He studied the cello at a music course at Chiba Prefectural Makuhari-Nishin High School (now Chiba Prefectural Makuhari General High School), attempted to major in the saxophone at Tokyo College of Music, and graduated from the Tokyo University of the Arts Faculty of Music in Vocal music.

In 1990, he debuted in the role of Raoul of Shiki Theatre Company's The Phantom of the Opera. Since then, Ishimaru has acted as a signboard actor for the company. Among other activities, he appeared in advertisements for Oronamin C (co-starring with SMAP's Takuya Kimura) and Nescafé Gold Blend. In 2013, he played branch manager Tadasu Asano in the Tokyo Broadcasting System television drama Hanzawa Naoki. On 2 April 2017, he was named the sixth chairperson of TV Asahi's long-running music programme Daimei no nai Ongakukai.

== Filmography ==
=== Stage ===
==== Part of Shiki ====
Title	Role
Andersen	Hans Christian Andersen
Aspects of Love	Alex Dillingham
Beauty and the Beast	Beast
Black Comedy	Brinzley Miller
Cats	Skimbleshanks
Dreaming	Dog Chillow
Elkos no Inori	George
Hamlet	Hamlet
Hibari	Charles
Illya Darling—Nichiyō wa Dame yo!	Homer
John Manjirō no Yume	Manjiro
Kono Seimei Dare no mono?	Ken Hayata
La Sauvage	Florent
Musical Ikoku no Oka	Hidetaka Kokonoe
Omoide o Uru Otoko	Man selling memories
The passer-through-walls	Dutillur
The Phantom of the Opera	Raoul, Vicomte de Chagny, the male ensemble
Song & Dance	Male singer
Undine	Hans
West Side Story	Jet Orchestra Tony
Yuriddis	Orphe
Rokumeikan	Einosuke Kiyohara

==== After leaving Shiki ====
Title	Role	Ref.
Enoch Arden		
A New Brain	Gordon Shuin	
Sunday in the Park with George	George	
The Coast of Utopia	Nikolai Ogalov	
L'Histoire du soldat		
The 39 Steps-Himitsu no Angō o Oe!	Richard Haney	
Elisabeth	Tote	
Twelfth Night	Marquess of Ocino / Bard / Traveler	
Glengarry Glen Ross		
Camille Claudel	Auguste Rodin	
Jekyll & Hyde	Henry Jekyll / Edward Hyde	
The Count of Monte Cristo	Edmond Danthes, Earl of Monte Cristo	
Lady Bess	Roger Ascam	
Limelight	Calvero	
The Scarlet Pimpernel	Percy Blakney	
Cabaret	MC	
The Secret Garden	Archibald Craven	
Love Never Dies	The Phantom	

=== Films ===
Year	Title	Role	Ref.
2010	Time Traveller: The Girl Who Leapt Through Time	Kazuo Fukamachi	
2015	Ōhi no Yakata	Louis XIV	
2015	Galaxy Turnpike	Doctor Muta	
2021	Musicophilia	Ryū Kishino	
2022	Sun and Bolero	Yoshifumi Tsuruma	
2022	Akira and Akira		
2024	Doraemon: Nobita's Earth Symphony	Wakner (voice)	
2025	Yukikaze	Toshiyuki Kosho	
2025	Emergency Interrogation Room: The Final Movie	The prime minister Yojiro Osanai	
2026	How to Generate a Perfect Crime	Moriarty	
2026	Never Guilty	Masaki Owada	

=== Television ===
Year	Title	Role	Notes	Ref.
2009	Shirasujirō	Ushiba Tomohiko		
2011	Heaven's Flower The Legend of Arcana	Takashi Kusakabe		
2012	Usuzakura-ki	Raihaha Togashi		
2013	Oyarihaishaku: Yoidore Ko Tō-ji Tomegaki	Gorobei Nomi		
2013	Yoidore Ko Tō-ji Tomegaki	Gorobei Nomi		
2013	Hanzawa Naoki	Masa Asano		
2014	Roosevelt Game	Fumiko Mikami		
2014	Dark Suits	Kiyoomi Matsuki		
2015	Burning Flower	Sufu Masanosuke	Taiga drama	
2015	Orient Kyūkō Satsujin Jiken	Taisa Goriki		
2015	Scapegoat	Shun Yanagisawa		
2015	Flowers for Algernon	Daigo Hachisuka		
2015	3ttsu no Machi no Monogatari	Akihiro Togo		
2015	Omotesandō Kōkō Gasshō-bu!	Yuki Uchida		
2016	Nobunaga Moyu	Akechi Mitsuhide	Television film	
2016	Doctor Chōsa Ha: Iryō Jiko no Yami o Abake	Masahiko Kawagoe		
2016	Suizokukan Girl	Hisayuki Kurano		
2016	Shizumanu Taiyō	Ishiguro		
2016	Eigyō Buchō: Natsuko Kira	Ryoichi Saito		
2016	Daddy Sister	Koichi Kunizane	Asadora	
2016	Chūshingura no Koi: Shitoya Hito-me no Chūshin	Ōishi Yoshio		
2017	Akira and Akira	Kazuma Kaidō		
2019	Shōnen Torajirō	Gozen-sama		
2020	Bones of Steel	Hajime Naitō		
2021	Reach Beyond the Blue Sky	Ōkubo Toshimichi	Taiga drama	
2026	Hakone Ekiden: Our Story	Hidehiko Takeshiba		

=== Animation ===
Title	Role
The Hunchback of Notre Dame	Quasimodo (dubbed)

=== Dubbing ===
Year	Title	Role
2015	The Sound of Music	Colonel Georg von Trapp (Christopher Plummer)
2023	Lyle, Lyle, Crocodile	Hector P. Valenti (Javier Bardem)

=== Advertisements ===
Year	Title	Ref.
	Oronamin C	
	Nescafé Gold Blend	
2014	Canon Inc. Pixus	
2014	House Ukon no Chikara	
	Zurich Insurance Group Anata Senyō Jidōsha Hoken	
2016	The National Art Center, Tokyo "Dalí Exhibition Tokyo Exhibition"	
2016	Meiji Chocolate Kōka	

=== Radio ===
Year	Title	Network
2010	Kanji Ishimaru no Theater e yōkoso	NHK FM Broadcast

=== MC-Navigator ===
Year	Title	Network
2014	Kanji Ishimaru no Mainichi ga Premiere	Eisei Gekijō

=== CD ===
Title	Label
"Kanji Ishimaru"	Sony Music Japan International
"Distance"	Sony Music Japan International
"Love Songs"	Sony Music Japan International
"Kanji Ishimaru no Musical e yōkoso"	Sony Music Japan International
"Stravinsky: Heishi no Monogatari"	Sony Music Japan International
"Kaijin Hyakumensō"	Sony Music Japan International
"My Musical Life"	Sony Music Japan International

=== Music guides ===
Year	Title
2013	The National Art Center "Andreas Guldsky Exhibition"
2014	Mori Arts Center Gallery "The Tutti of the Tate Art Museum Exhibition Prior to Rafael British Victorian Painting Dream"
2015	The National Art Center, "Magrid Exhibition Tokyo Exhibition"
2015	Kyoto City Museum of Art "Magrid Exhibition Kyoto Exhibition"

=== Others ===
Year	Title	Network	Ref.
2015	Minna no Uta "Kaijin Hyakumensō"	NHK	
2016	Joseph and the Amazing Technicolor Dreamcoat		
2017	Daimei no nai Ongakukai	TV Asahi	
