= Cloud of Sparrows =

Book by Takashi Matsuoka

- Author: Takashi Matsuoka
- Language: English
- Genre: Historical Fiction
- Publication date: 2002
- Publication place: United States
- Media type: Print (Paperback)

Cloud of Sparrows (2002) is the first historic novel by author Takashi Matsuoka featuring the struggle of Genji, the young Great Lord of Akaoka, in the year 1861. This is only six years after Japan opened to the West and features three American missionaries who become involved with Genji, notably, Emily who hopes to find solace in Japan and build a church and Matthew, a product of the American West who seeks revenge.

As Genji struggles to bring his clan to victory during turbulent times, he enlists the help of his lover and his master swordsman uncle, while fighting enemy clans and ninjas. The second book in the series, Autumn Bridge (2004), features the Cloud of Sparrows castle and the missionary Emily.

These are the only published works of Matsuoka, a Japanese American writer, who lives in Honolulu and worked at a Zen Buddhist temple.
