= Junkichi Matsuoka =

Japanese politician (1888–1951)

Matsuoka Junkichi
- 松岡 潤吉

Member of the House of Peers
- In office 25 July 1942 – 2 May 1947 Nominated by the Emperor
- In office 29 September 1932 – 28 September 1939 Nominated by the Emperor

Personal details
- Born: Baba Keizo; 18 September 1888 Seido, Hyōgo, Japan
- Died: 7 September 1951 (aged 62)
- Spouse: Chieko
- Children: Setsuko
- Relatives: Isao Matsuoka (grandson); Shuzo Matsuoka (great-grandson)
- Education: Keio University

Junkichi Matsuoka (松岡潤吉, Matsuoka Junkichi; 18 September 1888 – 7 September 1951) was a Japanese businessman and a member of the pre-war House of Peers.

== Life ==
Matsuoka was born to an affluent banking family in Seido Village, Muko County, Hyōgo Prefecture (present-day Ashiya City) as Baba Keizo (馬場 敬三). As a second son unlikely to gain an inheritance, he would marry Matsuoka Chieko and be adopted by her father, Matsuoka Shuzo, the scion of a powerful Gōnō family in what is now Nishinomiya City.

Graduating with a degree in finance from Keio University in 1909, he started working with his adopted father's company, Matsuoka Kisen Kaisha, a shipping company which was part of the Osaka Shōsen Kabushiki-gaisha co-op, and Osaka Godo Boseki, a textile company which would be bought out by Toyobo. He travelled widely throughout the United States and Europe promoting his businesses, and succeeded his father's role as ōjōya upon his retirement in 1925. He also served as CEO of Kureha Cotton Spinning Co (a textile company bought out by Itochu), an auditor of Hanshin Electric Railway, as a director of Toyo Kohan, Hokkaido Colliery and Steamship Co, Kashima Trust, and Toho, advisor to the Japan Shipping Association, council member of the Japan Amateur Sports Association, director of the Kobe Japan-Brazil Association, and honorary consul of Poland in Osaka.

In 1932, he was elected to the House of Peers in one of the 66 seats reserved for the landed gentry, serving a 7-year term until 1939, and reelected in a by-election for a second 7-year term in 1942, serving until May 1947 with the dissolution of the upper house under the new land reform rules established during the Occupation of Japan following the war.

Junkichi's daughter Setsuko would marry Tatsuro Kobayashi in 1930, the second son of Junkichi's business associate, Hankyu Railway and Toho founder Ichizō Kobayashi. Like Junkichi, as a second son, he was not expected to inherit anything from his father and was adopted into the Matsuoka family, succeeding his adopted father's role at Matsuoka Kisen Kaisha, as well as that of his older brother Kobayashi Fusao's role as General Manager of the Hankyu Toho Group upon his untimely death in 1957.
