= Shizuo Matsuoka =

- 松岡 静雄
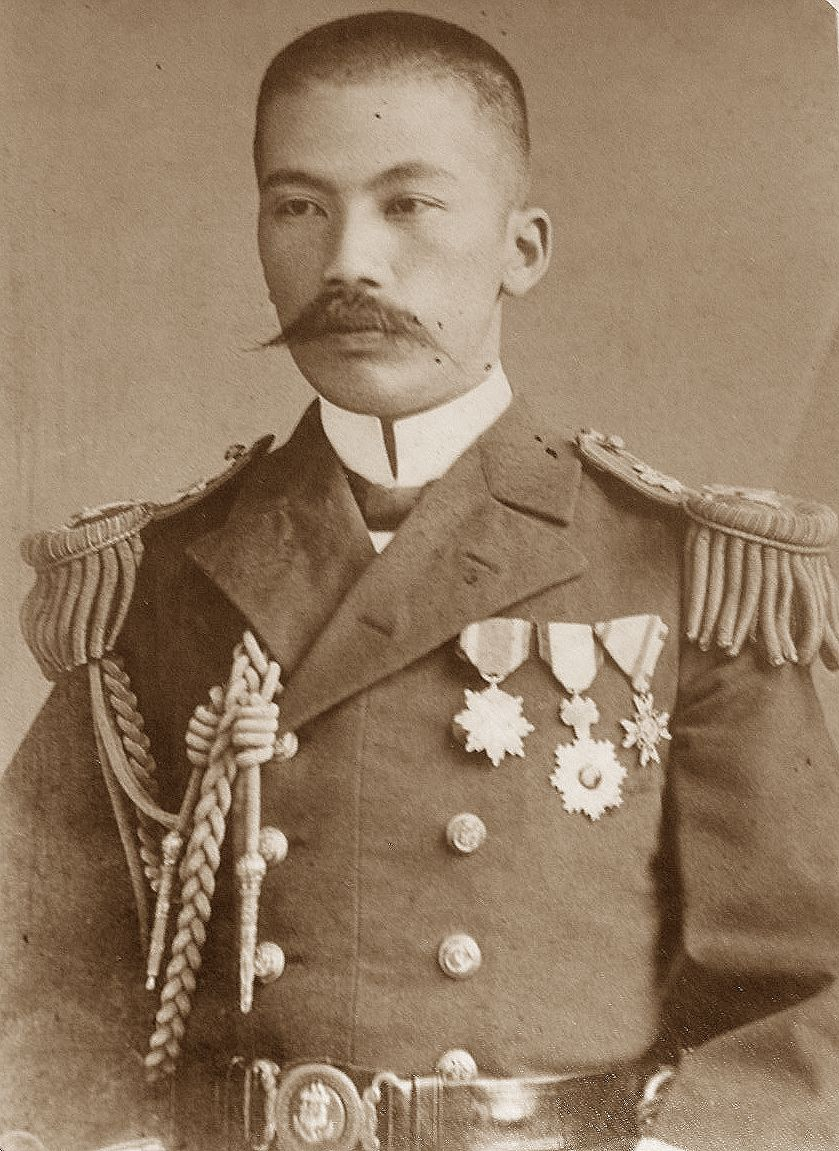
- Born: Shizuo Matsuoka; May 1, 1878; Fukusaki, Hyōgo, Japan
- Died: May 23, 1936 (aged 58); Fujisawa, Kanagawa, Japan
- Occupations: Naval Officer, Linguist, Ethnologist
- Known for: Kiki Ronkyu:Gaihen; Nihon Kogo Daijiten
- Spouse: Hatsuko Nomura
- Parent(s): Yakusai Matsuoka (father); Yasushi Nomura (father-in-law)

Japanese name
- Hiragana: まつおか しずお
- Shinjitai: 松岡静雄
Transcriptions
- Romanization: Matsuoka Shizuo

Shizuo Matsuoka (松岡 静雄, Matsuoka Shizuo; May 1, 1878 – May 23, 1936) was a Japanese naval officer, linguist, and ethnologist.

== Biography ==
Born in Tsujikawa, Tahara-mura, Shinto-gun, Hyogo (now part of Fukusaki, Hyogo), the seventh of eight children to physician Yakusai Matsuoka. He is the younger brother of noted Japanese scholar Kunio Yanagita. It was said that his mother dreamed of watching the sunset, and the halo lit around the sunset and looked like a military flag, saying, "This child is likely to be a soldier".

Shizuo would graduate from Imperial Japanese Naval Academy (25th class) and commissioned an ensign in the Imperial Japanese Navy in February 1899. During the Russo-Japanese War, he served aboard Chiyoda as Operations Officer and participated in the Battle of Tsushima. Following the war, he served aboard Chitose, as Chief of Staff for the 2nd Fleet, and Chief of Staff for Imperial General Headquarters.

In September 1909, Shizuo was assigned to the Japanese Embassy in Austria-Hungary as military attaché. Upon his return to Japan, he served as executive officer aboard Iwate, Asahi and Tsukuba. In December 1916, he promoted to captain, and assigned to Yokosuka Naval District as Director of the Navy Ministry's Library. In December 1918, he transferred to a reserve role and retired in May 1921.

Following his retirement, Shizuo moved to Kugenuma, Fujisawa City, Kanagawa Prefecture. He survived the Great Kanto Earthquake that devastated the area in 1923 and assisted in the clean-up efforts. He would take command of the Navy Gunboat Yūnagi, escorting the remains of Prince Moromasa back to Tokyo.

After the earthquake, Shizuo would settle on the west coast of Kugenuma, studying linguistics and folklore, publishing numerous books on the history of the Japanese language and the languages of Oceania.

== Family ==
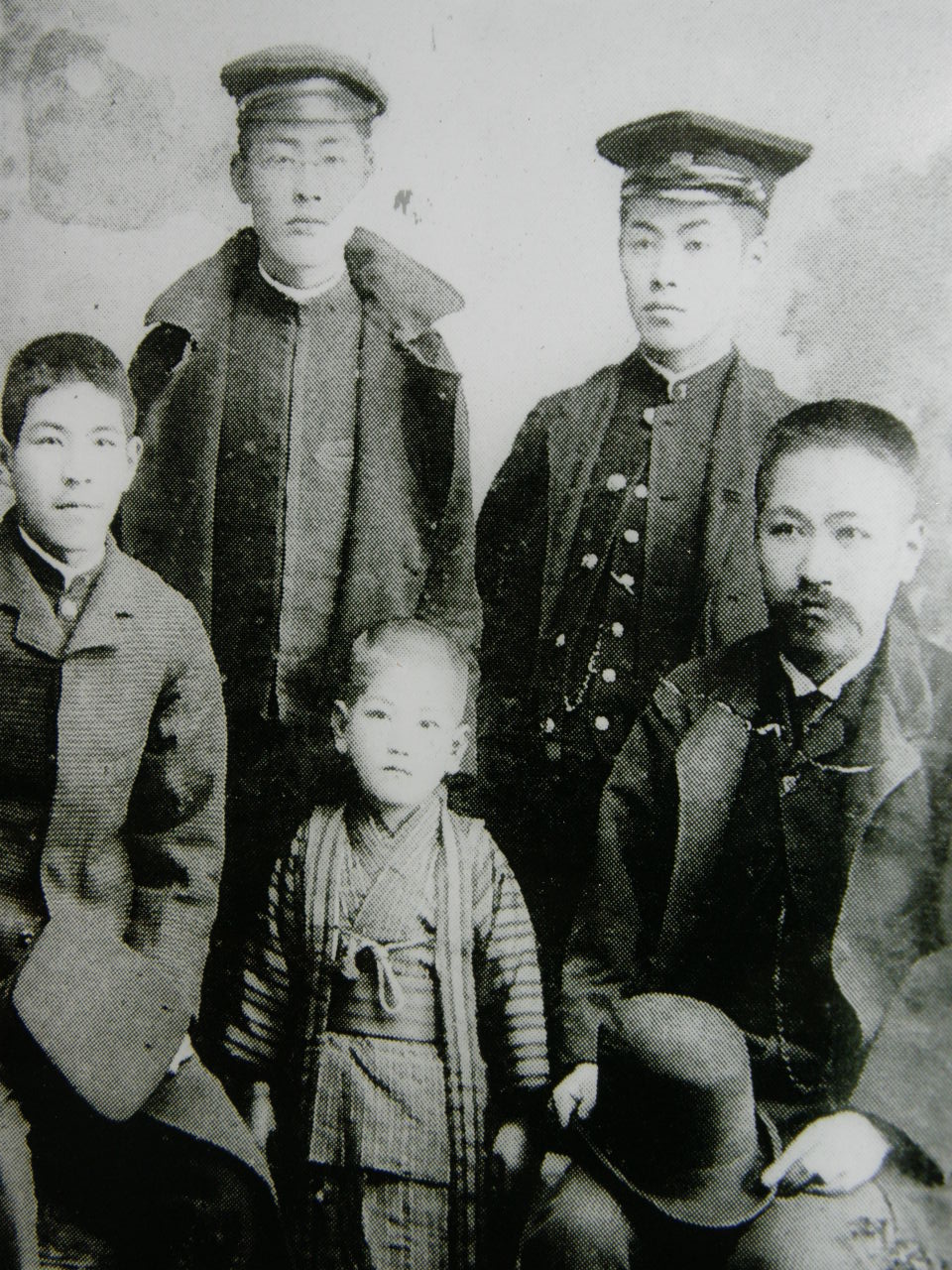
Shizuo (front left), with his brothers Teruo, Kunio, & Kanae. Kanae's son Fuyuki in front.

Shizuo was seventh of eight children. The oldest brother, Kanae, would follow in their father's footsteps and become a doctor. Brothers Yasuzo (Michiyasu Inoue) and Kunio (Yanagida) would be adopted by other families and become authors as well. Shizuo would marry Aiko Inajiro, who would pass shortly after their marriage. Shizuo would then go on to marry Hatsuko Nomura, the daughter of Viscount Yasushi Nomura. Shizuo and Hatsuko would have 4 children, 3 daughters and one son, Iwaki Matsuoka (1919–1995), who would go to become a professor at Hosei University in Business Administration.

== Honors ==
30 November 1907 - Lower-Sixth Court Rank (ja:従六位)
10 February 1913 - Upper-Sixth Court Rank (ja:正六位)
28 December 1916 - Bottom-Fifth Court Rank (ja:従五位)

== Bibliography ==
• Palm cultivation method, Agriculture Bureau, Ministry of Agriculture and Commerce, 1915
• Tentative letter method, History of Naval Military Command, 1915
• The Secret of Nanki, Shunyodo, 1917
• Japanese-Language Dictionary, Japan-Netherlands Traffic Research Committee, 1918
• Dutch-Japanese Dictionary, Japan-Netherlands Traffic Research Committee, 1921
• Tsumirei History, Iwanami Shoten, 1924
• Lecture on popular grammar, Kokubunshoin, 1925
• A Study of the Middle Class, Juei-kaku, 1925
• Pacific Ethnography, Oka Shoin, 1925
• Japanese Linguistics, Toue Shoin, 1926
• Study of Chamorro, Local Research Institute, 1926
• Traditional Japanese Magazine, Toue Shoin, 1926
• Harima Fudoki Monogatari, Toe Shoin, 1927
• Micronesian Ethnography, Oka Shoin, 1927
• Eastern songs and guard songs from ethnology, Ookayama Shoten, 1928
• Hitachi Fudoki Monogatari, Toe Shoin, 1928
• Study of Central Caroline, Local Research Institute, 1928
• Japan National Athletic Book, Council for Compilation of Japanese National Athletic Book, 1928
• The Japanese Dictionary of Ancient Languages, Volume 1 (Language) and Volume 2 (Kunen), Toue Shoin, 1929
• Study of Marshall Language, Local Research Institute, 1929
• Research on Palau, Local Research Institute, 1930
• Language Studies and Teaching Methods in Secondary School, 1930
• Singing Studies, Emerging Society Press, 1930
• Kikiron Kyodai Hen 1 Genesis, Emerging Society of Japan, 1930
• Study of Bonapée, Local Studies, 1930
• Kikiron Kyokushindai 2 Nissho Nison, Dobunkan, 1931
• Kikiron Kyodai Hen 3 Takamagahara, Dobunkan, 1931
• Kikiron Kyushindai Hen 4 Izumo Densetsu, Dobunkan, 1931
• Kikiron Kishindai 5 Kokusai, Dobunkan, 1931
• Kikiron Kyokushindai 6 Takachiho Period, Dobunkan, 1931
• Study of Yap", Local Research Institute, 1931
• Kikiron Kunitachi Hen 1 Emperor Jinmu, Dobunkan, 1931
• Kikiron Kunitachi Hen 2 Yamato Missing History, Dobunkan, 1931
• Kikiron Kenkyukuhen 3 Shikimiya, Dobunkan, 1931
• Kikiron Kikoku Hen 4th Daikan, Dobunkan, 1932
• Kikiron Kunitachi Hen 5 Domestic Unity, Dobunkan, 1932
• Kikiron Kenkyukokuhen 6 Gaiden Repatriation, Dobunkan, 1932
• Iyo Ueshiro History Isono Shrine, Local Research Institute, 1932
• Kikiron Outer Part Ancient Kayo (upper and lower), Dobunkan, 1932
• National Language and Ethnic Thought, Part 1, 1933
• Manyo Shukyu, Part I, Ryukasha, 1934
• National Language and Ethnic Thought, Part 2, 1934
• Japanese Language and Ethnic Thought, Part 3 (Japanese Language Education Correction), 1934
• Manyo Shuron, Part 2, Ryukasha, 1934, Educational Publishing Center, 1986
• Japanese Language and Ethnic Thought, Part 4 (Essays on Essays), 1934
• Japanese Language and Ethnic Thought, Part 5 (Grammar), 1935
• Simplified literature, 1935
• Comprehensive Study of Micronesian Language, Iwanami Shoten, 1935
• Arita Engai and Guardians, Mizuho Shoin, 1935
• Kagura-sha Auditorium, Shonan Japanese Language Studies, Vol. 1-9, 1935–1936
• A Study on National Attitudes, Jiji Shimpo, 1936 (published after his death)
• New Hen Japanese Dictionary, Toe Shoin, 1937
• Enlarged Japanese Dictionary of Ancient Languages, Toe Shoin, 1937
• Kaguradai Silent Language Book Review, 1938
• Japanese endemic religion, Toue Shoin, 1938
• Shizuo Matsuoka's Diary in Europe, edited by Yoshihiko Nakamura, Yamakawa Publishing, 1982
