= Mona Matsuoka =

Japanese-American fashion model

- Born: Monaka Matsuoka; 10 February 1998 (age 28); Atlanta, Georgia, USA
- Occupation: Model
- Years active: 2014–present
- Children: 1
- Modelling information
- Height: 1.78 m (5 ft 10 in)
- Hair colour: Dark Brown
- Eye colour: Dark Brown
- Agency: Bon Image (Japan); IMG Models (US/UK/FR/IT); Uno Models (Spain)

Mona Matsuoka (松岡モナ; Born February 10, 1998) is a Japanese-American female fashion model. She first signed with Bon Image in Tokyo and was recognized as a Women of the Year 2014 by Vogue Japan.

== Early life ==
Mona was born in Atlanta, Georgia, to an American father and a Japanese mother. Her family moved frequently and her early life was a blur, however she spent three years in Arizona which she recalls fondly. She moved to Hiroshima with her mother at the age of nine and was introduced to modeling at 10 when her mother sent her profile to several model agencies in Tokyo.

Her first job was for tween magazine Nico★Petit and she soon started to make a name for herself in the Japanese market.

== Career ==
At the age of 15, she was selected for anteprima at Milan Fashion Week and went on to make her international debut at Paris Fashion Week for the Fall/Winter 2014-15 collections with designers such as Chanel, Dolce & Gabbana, Kenzo, and Miu Miu, and receiving the Vogue Japan Women of the Year 2014 award.

Today, she busies herself with many print and commercial advertising campaigns, magazine editorials, and performing at 44 brand shows at the New York, London, Milan, and Paris collections.
