= Oda-gumi =

Japanese organized crime (yakuza) group

Joji at a 1978 press conference

The Oda-gumi (織田組) is a yakuza organization founded in 1958 by Hideomi "Joji" Oda in Chūō-ku, Osaka, Japan. Oda-gumi would join the powerful Yamaguchi-gumi syndicate as a subsidiary organization under third generation kumicho Kazuo Taoka in 1964, with Oda serving as the Yamaguchi-gumi saiko-komon under Taoka with the right to maintain his own family.

The deaths of Kazuo Taoka of heart failure in 1981, and the then Yamaguchi-gumi heir apparent Kenichi Yamamoto the following year created a power vacuum in Yamaguchi-gumi leadership. Joji's support for the short lived fourth generation boss Masahisa Takenaka in the resulting Yama-Ichi War, coupled with his arrest in Honolulu in 1985 would force Joji into retirement from the yakuza.

Yoshio Matsuoka succeeded Joji as the second oyabun of Oda-gumi. Matsuoka lead the Oda-gumi until another change in Yamaguchi-gumi leadership as fifth generation head Yoshinori Watanabe retired in 2005 and Shinobu Tsukasa assumed power as kumicho of Yamaguchi-gumi, creating a rift in Oda-gumi membership as members loyal to Tsukasa lieutenant Seiji Takahashi split from Matsuoka's group, leading to Matsuoka's retirement in 2006.

Matsuoka wakagashira Eiji Takano would succeed Matsuoka as the third generation boss of Oda-gumi with Tsukasa's blessing to repair the rift with Takahashi's faction. The recent split between Yamaguchi-gumi and Watanabe's former Yamaken-gumi faction has again brought the Tsukasa aligned Oda-gumi into the spotlight as members of the Yamaken faction, Kobe Yamaguchi-gumi, deliberately crashed a car into Oda-gumi's offices in March 2016. Adding to the family's difficulties, Takano was also arrested on unrelated mail fraud charges in June 2016.

Oda-gumi's troubles continued in January 2020 when the Oda-gumi was named as a designated boryokudan group by the Osaka Prefecture, allowing the city of Higashi Osaka, where their offices had been relocated, to seize the property under Yakuza exclusion ordinances. Takano was again arrested with 3 executives for wire fraud and falsifying official documents. In March 2021, Takano would be demoted from his role as a Yamaguchi-gumi wakanaka executive to hosa, leaving the future of the organization in doubt.

== Leadership ==
• First Generation : Hideomi "Joji" Oda (1958-1986)
• Second Generation : Yoshio Matsuoka (1986-2006)
• Third Generation : Eiji Takano (2006–present)
