= Linah Matsuoka =

Japanese actress

- 松岡李那
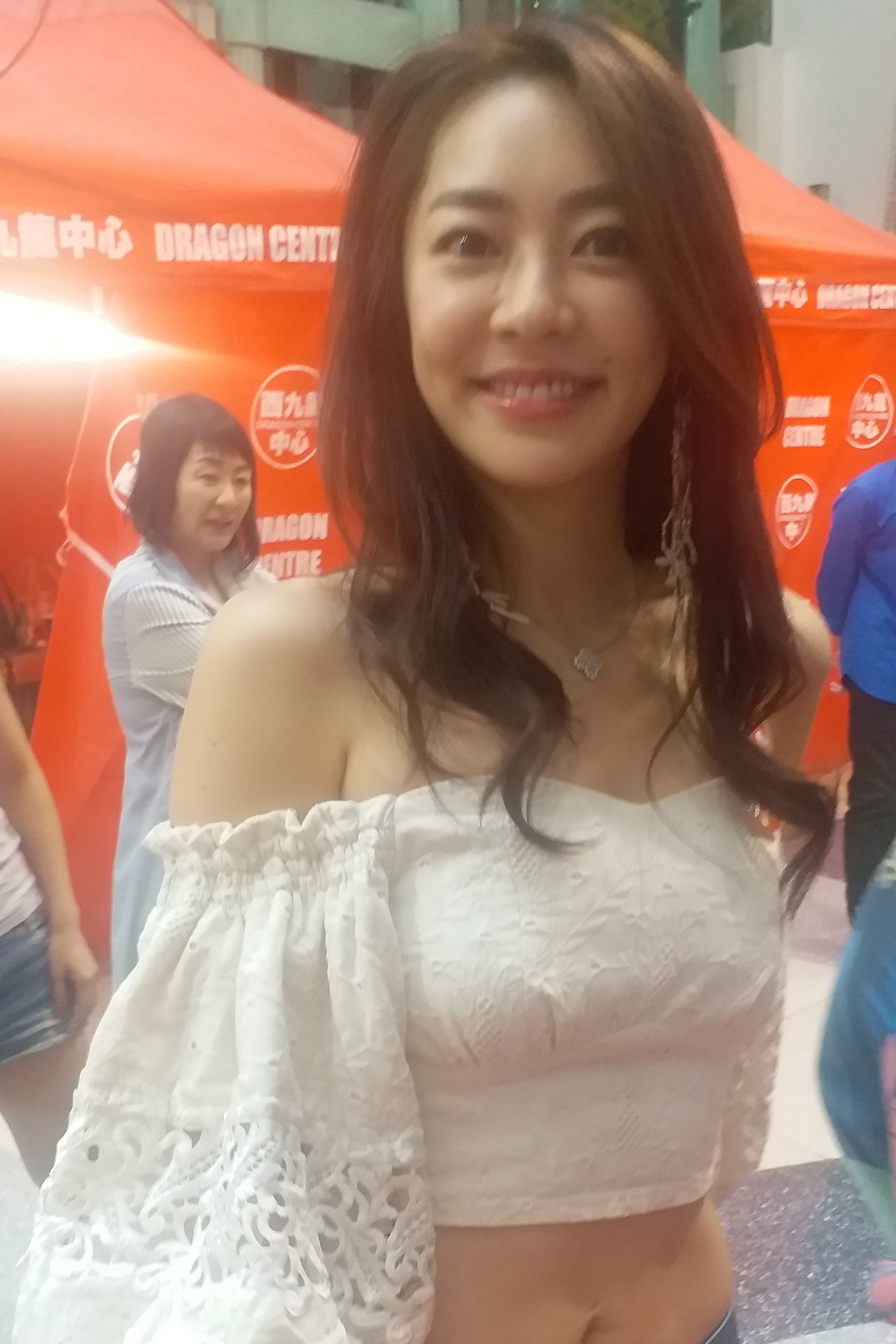
- Matsuoka in 2019
- Born: Kure, Hiroshima, Japan
- Occupation: Actress
- Years active: 2010–present
- Known for: Deception of the Novelist; Lan Kwai Fong 2
- Height: 170 cm (5 ft 7 in)

Linah Matsuoka (松岡李那) is a Hong Kong based Japanese actress and former member of the Japanese-Korean girls group Girls Kingdom.

== Filmography ==
=== Film ===
- Summer Love Love (夏日戀神馬), (2011)
- Lan Kwai Fong 2 (喜愛夜蒲) – Maxim, (2012)
- The Best Plan Is No Plan (溝女不離三兄弟) – Lulu, (2013)
- Undercover Duet (猛龍特囧), (2015)
- The Mermaid (美人魚) – George's Assistant, (2016)
- Deception of the Novelist (作家的謊言：筆忠誘罪) – Elaine Chen, (2019)
- Unification of Japan Side Story: Tamura Yuto 2 (日本統一外伝 田村悠人2) 明美（2021）

=== Television ===
- Good Food, Trendy Food (食德好‧潮食男女) – self, (2013)
- The Crossing Hero (超級大英雄), (2015)
- Sakura Maruko (櫻桃小丸子) – Noguchi Aiko, (2017)
