= Japanese adult adoption =

Legal and social practice in Japan

Japanese adult adoption is the practice in Japan of legally and socially accepting a nonconsanguineal adult into an offspring role of a family. The centuries-old practice was developed as a mechanism for families to extend their family name, estate and ancestry without an unwieldy reliance on blood lines. Still common today, adult adoption is a dynamic tool for social and economic mobility.

There is evidence that this practice began as early as sometime in the 13th century within the sect of Buddhism known as Pure Land Buddhism, but only really became widely used in the Tokugawa shogunate (or Edo period), which began around 1600 and lasted until 1868. During the Tokugawa period, much of the Samurai class would adopt sons for the purpose of creating a strong, fixed position in society through the assumption of positions such as the head of household and the head of the business. It also was a way for households lacking in sons to continue a patrilineal line, and remain a functioning societal power. This was its most common purpose, but was also seen by the adoptees as a way to climb the social ladder by leaving the title of second son, etc. behind.

== History and origins ==
Though it may have originated earlier, adult adoption was used within the sect of Pure Land Buddhism. This sect of Buddhism, called Jodo Shinshu, is associated with the Honganji temples located near Kyoto. Sons associated with the Honganji would be adopted out into prominent families of the surrounding areas. It most likely developed as a strategy for gaining power within the community, but it just happened to have some practical consequences associated with it. When families would find themselves lacking either a capable male heir or a son altogether, they would turn to adoption by marrying a man to one of their daughters, or just merely taking them into their household. It was a way for families to ensure the continuity of a reliable male line that would take over as the family head and sometimes the head of the family business.

Adult adoption lost some of its steam during the following years after its use in the 13th century. It really became a common occurrence around 1600 when the Tokugawa period began. Starting out small, it was used mostly by the Samurai class, especially those who lacked an elder or a capable son. Those who wished to adopt were encouraged to look within their own extended family for suitable candidates, but would adopt outside of the family if there were no viable options. Adopted sons (during the Tokugawa period, especially in the early years) usually were a part of the same social circle and income level. From the point of view of the adopted son, it was not so much an increase of class position, but rather a way to receive an independent life by becoming a first-born son. This does not mean that there were no vertical jumps in the social stratum by less wealthy individuals, but it was significantly less common. By being adopted, second-born sons were able to take over as the heads of households, and become the leader of the family business as well as a leader within the community itself.

The popularity of this practice rose steadily throughout the Tokugawa period, and soon became a common occurrence among social groups other than Samurai. The reason for its popularity among the ruling class has been speculated to have risen out of a low birth rate among wealthy and important, though there are many other reported reasons or inconsistencies that refute this explanation. It is also worth noting that to think of succession as tied through the possession of an heir and that lacking one is the only historical cause for adoption is reductive, even in generality; complexities such as "passing over" a firstborn and adoption while already having an heir have strong historical precedent throughout the Tokugawa era.

What is known, though, is that it has continued to be practiced in modern Japan, although it has become much more of a business strategy in certain areas.

== Modern practice ==
One of the reasons why adoption rates in Japan are so predominantly adults is that, while a system of foster care does exist, the pathway from foster care into adoption isn't encouraged by the government as a strong alternative.

Adult adoption takes many forms in modern Japanese practice. Yōshi-engumi (adoption of an heir) often entails the adoption of a daughter's husband by her family. The son-in-law becomes a mukoyōshi, an adopted husband. Mukoyōshi status is preferred by families seeking a strong heir. Married couples who are nonconsanguineal with the adopting family may also be adopted into a family. Individual adult adoption occurs as well, involving both single adult males and females. Males and females who do not marry a daughter or son of their adopted family may marry outside of the family.

The adoption of one individual by another in Japan is commonly used as an alternative to same-sex marriage, which is both prohibited and not legally recognized in Japan. By the elder party adopting the younger (as stipulated by the rules of adoption), the estate of either party can then be inherited or absorbed by the other without the payment of the prohibitive gift tax that would otherwise apply.

Although the practice has endured, social opinion and widespread practice of adult adoption have shifted greatly over the course of the 20th and 21st centuries. In the early 20th century for example, becoming a mukoyōshi was considered an embarrassment or even emasculating. In the absence of a gain of power or capital, a mukoyōshi could be equated with a bride as he adopted a new surname and adjusted to his in-laws. A traditional saying, "As long as you have three gō of rice bran, do not become an adopted husband" exemplifies this. As regular adoption rates climbed in the late 20th century, however, and adult adoption became more closely intertwined with family firms and capitalism, adult adoption disseminated evenly to urban and rural areas. Today, adult adoption is often viewed as opportunistic and, as a result, has gained a degree of prestige. At times, it is sought after.

The practice of brokering marriages between marriageable young women in families with business firms and young men has become a fairly common and profitable practice. Some males are now joining dating sites specifically made for men looking to become mukoyōshi, and be adopted by families who need a male successor for their businesses. One of the most popular was created by Chieko Date and enables families to meet with potential suitors for their daughters.

== Adoptive kinship ==
Japan is characterized by a bilateral kinship system including patrilineal and matrilineal elements of descent recognition. Succession is largely determined by patrilineal succession via household headship; headship is usually passed in accordance with primogeniture from eldest son to eldest son. Household headship usually determines the individual in control of a household and its estate, possibly including an associated farm or business. Because of the deeply rooted importance of the family as a multigenerational corporation in Japan, familial continuity and stability of household leadership are given precedence over consanguinity. It is common to include some non-consanguineal household members in household descent, particularly affinal males and adopted descendants. Adult adoption, just one solution to the restrictions presented by a rigid system of succession, ensures the presence of a household head. The Koseki, a family registry system, legally defines the head of a household, whether the head is male or female. Adoptions are officially recorded in a family's Koseki. Adoption secures a full legal, ideological, and kinship role as a son or daughter for an adoptee. An adopted adult forgoes their original surname and line of descent and takes on the adopted family's name and line. Any children born to an adopted adult, such as to a mukoyōshi and his wife, are considered part of the adopted family's descent. Adopted adults also accept the responsibility of the adequate care of the family's ancestors in accordance with Buddhist doctrine.

== Legalities for adult adoption ==
When an adult is adopted into a family in Japan through regular adoption (Yôshi engumi), they are expected to inherit the adoptive family's name in exchange for an inheritance. They are also expected to take on the adoptive family's ancestors. Terms of the adoption are that families cannot adopt more than one adoptee if they already have children. If the prospective adoptive family is childless, they can adopt two children. The adoptee must be at least 15 years old, and must be at least a day younger than the adoptive parents. The current average adoptive age is about 20–30 years old. In the case of a mukoyōshi, the husband is adopted by the parents of his wife and made head of the business. This is often the case when the only heir to take over the family business is female. If the adoptee decides to go back to their biological family, goes missing or deserts their adopted family, the adoption can legally be dissolved.

== Economic impact ==
In contemporary Japanese society, many Japanese businesses have stayed in the family line because of the convenience and prevalence of adult adoption. In the past, merchant families in Western Japan would adopt an heir if the biological predecessor was incapable of taking over the family business. When there is no son to inherit the company or the son is deemed too inadequate or unintelligent to take over, the CEO will then turn to adult adoption, adopting a worthy employee from the business. This is also the case when the original biological heir is uninterested in taking over the family business. Large successful family run corporations such as Suzuki have utilized this strategy. The former CEO of Suzuki, Osamu Suzuki, was the fourth adopted son that has headed the company. Suzuki bypassed his own biological heir and named Hirotaka Ono as his successor, because he felt that his biological son was less capable. Other famous companies using this method are Kikkoman, Canon, Toyota, and Matsui Securities. The world's oldest family business, the Nishiyama Onsen Keiunkan, has been passed down through the family name for 1,300 years. If the adopted male heir falls short of success, he can be passed over and disinherited from the family, although it is very rare. If this happens, another successor can be adopted, since the first lost his inheritance.

A 2026 study found that "adopted heirs were substantially more likely to remain elite and to reach the extreme upper tail of the income distribution than biological heirs. The results are robust to family, regional, occupational, and educational controls."

== See also ==
- Tongyangxi
