= Toho =

Japanese entertainment corporation

Toho Co., Ltd.

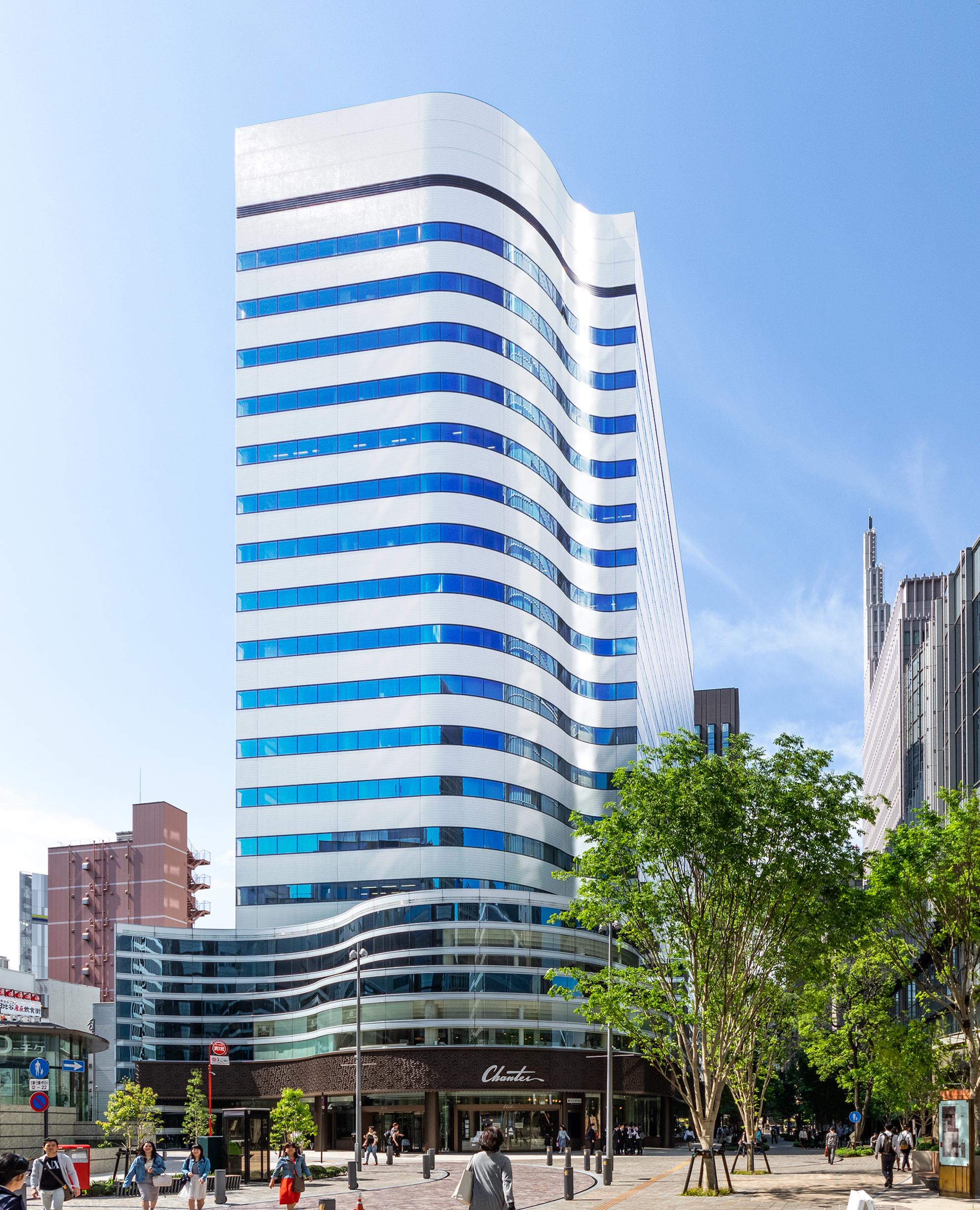
- Headquarters in Chiyoda, Tokyo
- Native name: 東宝株式会社
- Romanized name: Tōhō Kabushiki-gaisha
- Type: Public
- Traded as: TYO: 9602; FSE: 9602; Nikkei 225 component (TYO)
- Industry: Media; Entertainment
- Predecessors: Tokyo-Takarazuka Theatre Company; Photo Chemical Laboratory; J.O. Studio; Toho Film Distribution; Toho Eiga
- Founded: August 12, 1932; 94 years ago (as Tokyo-Takarazuka Theatre Company)
- Founder: Ichizō Kobayashi
- Headquarters: Yūrakuchō, Chiyoda, Tokyo, Japan
- Area served: Worldwide
- Key people: Hiro Matsuoka (president and CEO); Yoshishige Shimatani (chairman)
- Products: Motion pictures Television programs Video games
- Services: Film production Film distribution Movie theatres
- Number of employees: 3,873
- Parent: Hankyu Hanshin Toho Group (Note: The controlling shareholders of Toho are affiliated with the Hankyu Hanshin Toho Group. They are: Hankyu Hanshin Holdings (12.81%), Hankyu Hanshin Properties (8.51%), and H_{2}O Retailing (7.67%).)
- Divisions: Motion Picture Department; Theatrical Department; Corporate Real Estate Department
- Subsidiaries: Toho Studios; International Television Films; Toho-Towa; Toho Cinemas; Toho Entertainment; Toho Music; Toho Eizo Bijutsu; Toho Entertainment Asia; Toho Costume; Toho Global; Toho International; Toho Stage Craft; Toho Stella; Toho Marketing; Toho Facilities; Toho Building Management; Toho Kyoei; Toho Retail; Science Saru; GKIDS; Toho Animation Studio (67.4%)
- Website: www.toho.co.jp

Toho Co., Ltd. (Note: Sometimes stylized as Toho Company, Ltd., especially in older English-language production logos.) (Japanese: 東宝株式会社, Hepburn: Tōhō Kabushiki-gaisha) is a Japanese film production, distribution, and theater stage exhibition company. It is headquartered in Chiyoda, Tokyo, and is one of the core companies of the Osaka-based Hankyu Hanshin Toho Group. Toho is best known for producing and distributing many of Ishirō Honda and Eiji Tsuburaya's kaiju and tokusatsu films as well as the films of Akira Kurosawa and the animated films produced by Studio Ghibli, Studio Pierrot, Production I.G, Shin-Ei Animation, TMS Entertainment (except for Anpanman), Madhouse, Inc., CoMix Wave Films, and OLM, Inc. The company has released the majority of the highest-grossing Japanese films, and through its subsidiaries, is the largest film importer in Japan. The Doraemon film series, distributed by Toho since 1980, is the highest-grossing film series and animated film series in Japan. It is also one of the highest-grossing non-English language film series.

Toho's most famous creation is Godzilla, featured in 36 of the company's films. Godzilla, Rodan, Mothra, King Ghidorah, and Mechagodzilla are described as Toho's Big Five due to their numerous appearances throughout the Godzilla franchise, including the Shōwa, Heisei, Millennium, Reiwa, and the American Monsterverse eras, as well as spin-offs. Toho has also been involved in the production of numerous anime titles. Its current subsidiaries include Toho Studios, Toho International, Toho Cinemas, Toho-Towa Co., Ltd. (Note: 東宝東和株式会社, Tōhō-Tōwa Kabushiki-gaisha) (Japanese theatrical distributor of Universal Pictures films since 2007), and Towa Pictures (Note: 東和ピクチャーズ株式会社, Tōwa Pikuchāzu Kabushiki-gaisha) (Japanese theatrical distributor of Paramount Pictures films since 2016 and Warner Bros. Pictures films since 2026). The company is the largest shareholder (7.96%) of Fuji Media Holdings Inc.

Toho is one of the four members of the Motion Picture Producers Association of Japan (MPPAJ), is the largest of Japan's Big Four film studios, and is the only film studio that is a component of the Nikkei 225 index.

== History ==
Toho was created by the founder of the Hankyu Railway, Ichizō Kobayashi, in 1932 as the Tokyo-Takarazuka Theatre Company (株式会社東京宝塚劇場, Kabushiki gaisha Tōkyō Takarazuka Gekijō). It managed much of the kabuki in Tokyo and, among other properties, the eponymous Tokyo Takarazuka Theatre and the Imperial Garden Theater in Tokyo; Toho and Shochiku enjoyed a duopoly over theaters in Tokyo for many years.

=== Labor disputes (1946–1948) ===
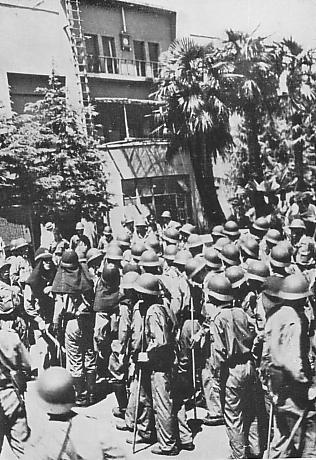
American soldiers outside Toho Studios in August 1948 due to the intensity of the third dispute

After the end of World War II, the new Occupation government allowed and encouraged the formation of labor unions, which had been banned under the Imperial government. During a general strike of film studio employees beginning in October 1946, a group of Toho's ten top stars led by Denjiro Okochi split from the main Toho union along with 445 employees. During the resolution of the strike, a closed-shop provision with the main union led to the establishment of the Shintoho Company, which comprised the members of the dissenting union and former Toho facilities.

The loss of major stars led to the hiring and training of new stars, including Toshiro Mifune. The contract made after the strike stipulated that Toho would only produce films approved by a committee that included union members, which led to filmmakers gaining unprecedented creative and productive control over their films. While Toho produced only thirteen films in 1947, six Toho films, including One Wonderful Sunday, directed by Akira Kurosawa, were ranked among the best ten films of the year in Kinema Junpo. However, each film had double or triple the budget of films produced by other studios, and the company suffered severe losses.

In 1948, the new Toho president Tetsuzo Watanabe ordered a return of the wartime quota of 24 films per year and the end of control over production by the union. In April, Toho management announced the dismissal of 1200 employees, with the aim of both cutting expenses and eliminating Communist leaders from the union. Negotiations failed and the union occupied the studio on April 15, joined by activists from the Japan Communist Party and other organizations, erecting barricades and closing the main gates.

On August 13, the Tokyo District Court decided in Toho's favor, and on the morning of August 19, a district police chief arrived at the front gate to read out the court decision. Two thousand policemen surrounded the studio, reinforced by soldiers, three airplanes, and several armored cars and tanks sent by the U.S. Eighth Army. The union leaders agreed to end their occupation on the condition the union was not disbanded.

Toho was severely weakened after the strikes and produced only four films in 1948 and five films in 1949, and continued to distribute Shintoho films until the end of 1949.

=== International expansion (1953–present) ===
In May 1953, Toho established Toho International, a Los Angeles-based subsidiary intended to target North American and Latin American markets. Seven Samurai was among the first films offered for foreign sales.

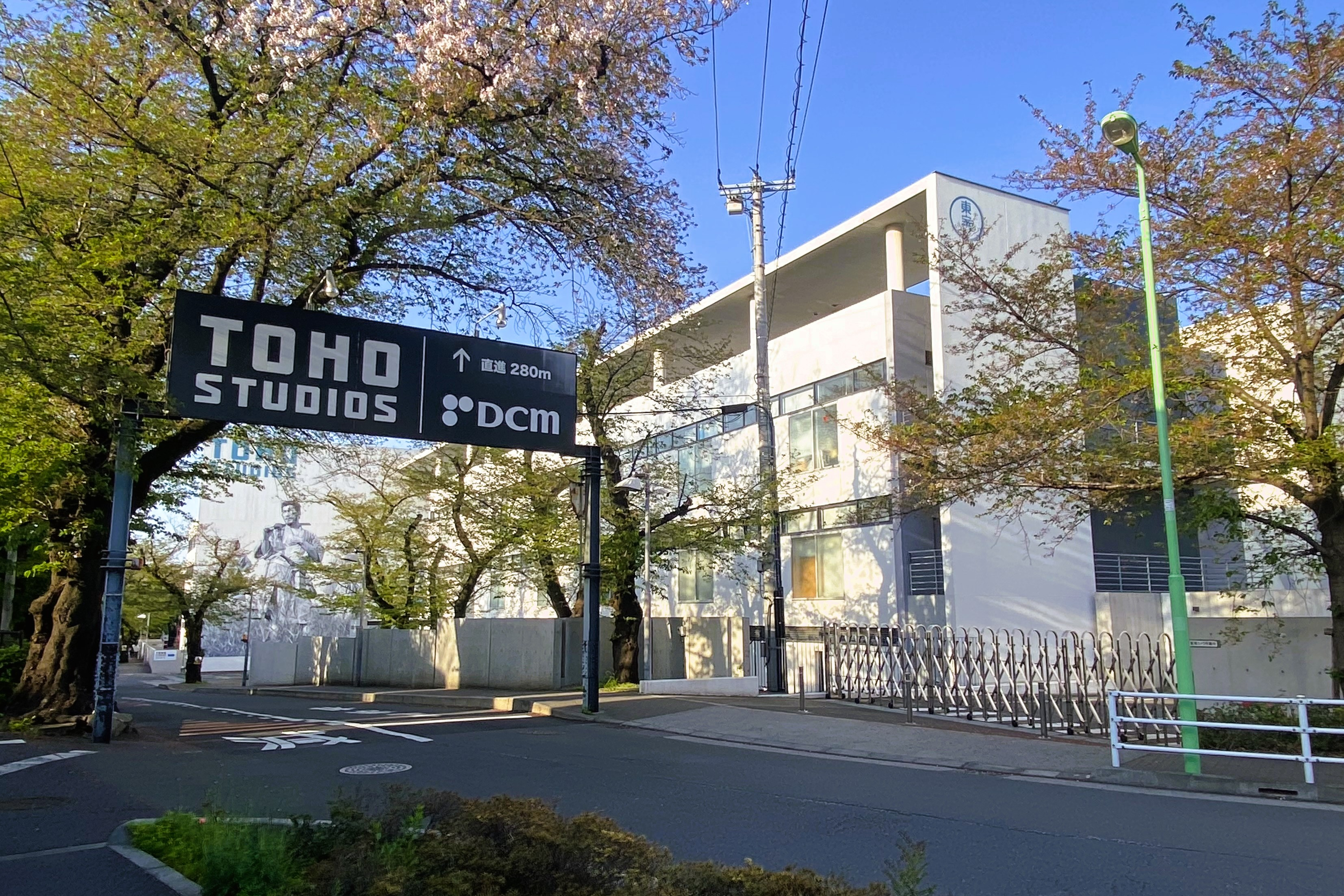
Toho Studios in Setagaya, Tokyo

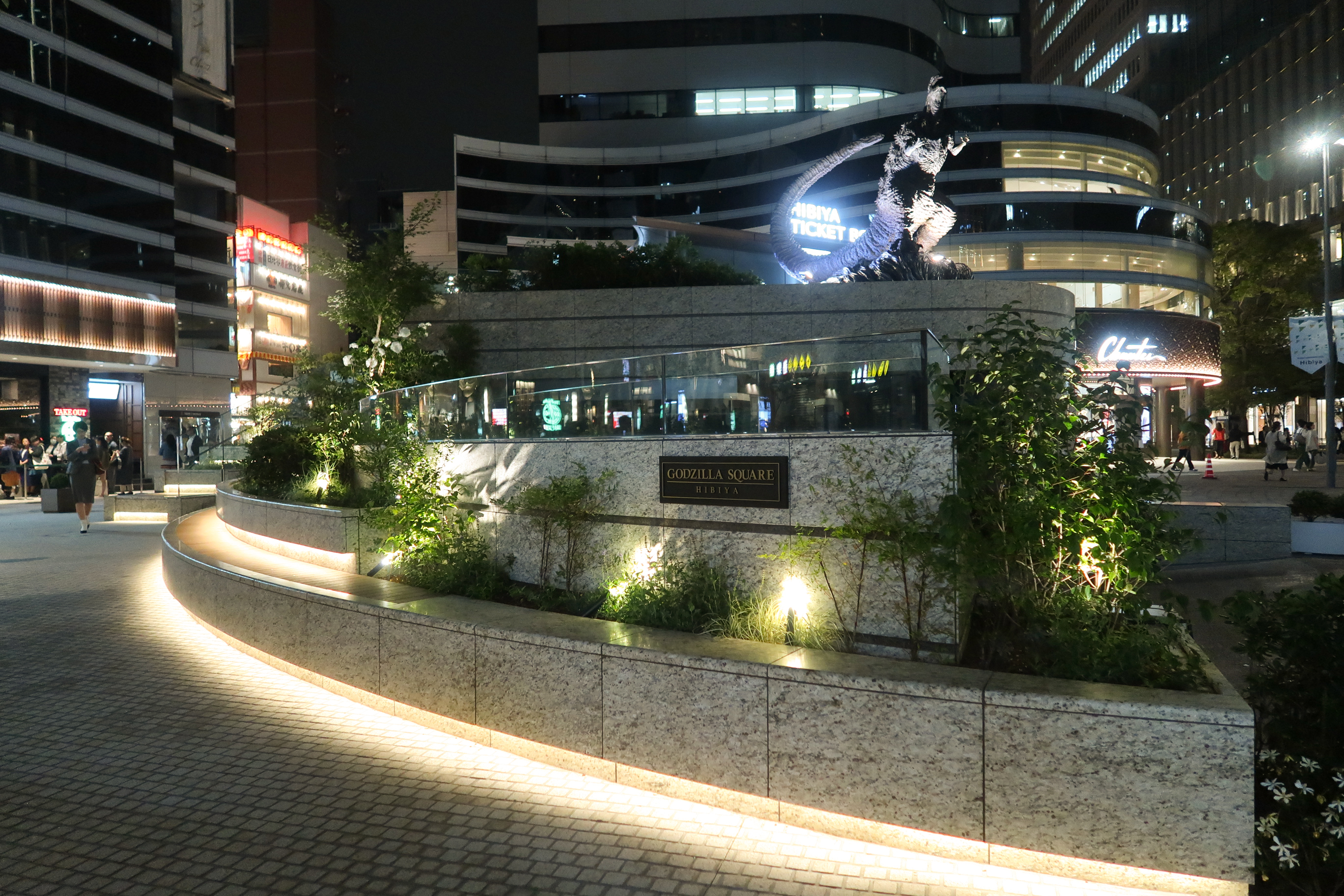
The Hibiya Godzilla Square located nearby the headquarters in Chiyoda, Tokyo

Toho and Shochiku competed with the influx of Hollywood films and boosted the film industry by focusing on new directors such as Akira Kurosawa, Kon Ichikawa, Keisuke Kinoshita, Ishirō Honda, and Kaneto Shindo.

After several successful film exports to the United States during the 1950s through Henry G. Saperstein, Toho took over the La Brea Theatre in Los Angeles to show its films without the need to sell them to a distributor. It was known as the Toho Theatre from the late 1960s until the 1970s. Toho also had a theater in San Francisco and opened a theater in New York City in 1963. The Shintoho Company, which existed until 1961, was named New Toho because it broke off from the original company. Toho has contributed to the production of some American films, including Sam Raimi's 1998 film, A Simple Plan and Paul W. S. Anderson's 2020 military science fiction/kaiju film, Monster Hunter.

In 2019, Toho invested ¥15.4 billion ($14 million) into its Los Angeles-based subsidiary Toho International Inc. as part of its "Toho Vision 2021 Medium-term Management Strategy", a strategy to increase content, platform, real-estate, beat JPY50 billion profits, and increase character businesses on Toho intellectual properties such as Godzilla. Hiroyasu Matsuoka was named the representative director of the US subsidiary.

In 2020, Toho acquired a 34.8% stake in the animation studio TIA, with ILCA and Anima each retaining a 32.6% stake. In 2022, Toho acquired Anima's 32.6% stake to take a controlling 67.4% stake in TIA, making the studio a subsidiary, and ultimately renaming the studio into Toho Animation Studios.

In October 2023, Toho's non-Japanese and Asian subsidiaries were split into Toho Global, a standalone subsidiary. In December, Toho announced its intent to acquire a 25% stake in Fifth Season for $225 million via Toho International. Following the completion of the deal, Fifth Season will be valued at $900 million; CJ ENM will remain the majority shareholder in the company, with former owner Endeavor also continuing to serve as a strategic shareholder. CEOs Graham Taylor and Chris Rice stated that this investment would empower the company to continue the expansion of its premium slate and create opportunities for collaboration between Fifth Season, Toho and CJ ENM to produce global content as well as content produced in Japan.

Following the success of Godzilla Minus One as its first self-distributed film in the U.S., Toho declared in March 2024 that Godzilla is its "Intellectual property (IP) treasure" and it had regained retailing rights overseas (which were once abandoned), and now can sell, advertise, and distribute its own products to consumers outside Japan directly. The company also said that the film winning Best Visual Effects at the 96th Academy Awards is helping them gain more recognition and advancing more business extension overseas.

In April 2025, Toho announced plans to invest ¥15 billion ($105 million) into Godzilla, including a Godzilla Minus One sequel, video games, merchandise, and amusement park attractions, as part of a larger ¥120 billion ($830 million) investment into expanding its film and anime projects. In July 2025, Toho International head Kōji Ueda told Bloomberg that there are potential plans for a sequel to Shin Godzilla (2016) and an untitled Southeast Asia focused project. On 19 December, Toho announced the acquisition of Scottish-based distributor Anime Limited from Plaion Pictures for an undisclosed amount, with the company becoming a subsidiary of a newly-formed European branch of Toho Global, expanding Toho's operations to the United Kingdom and France. As part of the deal, Toho Global appointed Plaion Pictures as its exclusive distributor for most of Europe, including Germany and Italy. On the same day, Toho Global also announced that it would open up a London-based office at the end of the year.

In September 2025, following the successful releases of Japanese blockbuster films Demon Slayer: Kimetsu no Yaiba – The Movie: Infinity Castle, Kokuho, and Exit 8, Toho, via Toho-Towa signed a distribution deal with Warner Bros. Pictures to release its titles in Japan.

== Productions and distributions ==
=== Films ===
- Doraemon (1980–present)
- Crayon Shin-Chan (1993–present)
- Case Closed (1997–present)
- Pokémon (1998–present)
- Yo-kai Watch (2014–present)

=== Tokusatsu ===
- Godzilla (1954–present)
- Ultraman (1967–present)
- Shin Japan Heroes Universe (2016–present)

=== Primary ===
Year	Title	Country	Production	
1954–present	Godzilla franchise	Japan	Toho	in theaters
1956-present	Toho Kaiju Movies franchise	Japan	Toho	in theaters

=== Television ===
==== Primary (Big 2 Toho Superheroes) ====
Year	Title	Country	Production	Super Hero Force	First release	Latest release	Upcoming release
1996–present	Guyferd franchise	Japan	Capcom; TV Tokyo; ADK Emotions	Sunday; 7:30 (JST)	Shichisei Tōshin Guyferd (1996)		Untitled Guyferd entry (TBA)
2003–present	Chouseishin franchise	Japan	Konami; TV Tokyo; Dentsu	Sunday; 8:00 (JST)	Chouseishin Gransazer (2003)	Chousei Kantai Sazer-X (2005)	Untitled Chouseishin entry (TBA)

==== Secondary (Other Tokusatsu) ====
- Ike! Godman (1972)
- Warrior of Love: Rainbowman (1972)
- Zone Fighter (1973)
- Ike! Greenman (1973)
- Warrior Of Light: Diamond Eye (1973)
- Flying Saucer War Bankid (1976)
- Megaloman (1979)
- Electronic Brain Police Cybercop (1988)
- Godzilla Island (1997)
- Kawaii! Jenny (2007)
- Godziban (2019–present)

==== Anime ====
- Belle and Sebastian (1981)
- Igano Kabamaru (1983)
- Touch (1985)
- Kimagure Orange Road (1987)
- Baoh (1989)
- Godzilland (1992)
- Shimajiro (1993–present)
- Midori Days (co-production; 2004)

==== Toho Animation ====

Toho Animation (stylized as TOHO animation) is a Japanese animation production label founded in 2012, and owned by Toho. The process of the label is done in a similar fashion to Sony Pictures Animation. Through this division, Toho has an animation studio joint venture named Toho Animation Studio with ILCA.

- Psycho-Pass (2012)
- Majestic Prince (2013)
  - Galactic Armored Fleet Majestic Prince: Wings to the Future (2016)
  - Galactic Armored Fleet Majestic Prince: Genetic Awakening (2016)
- Fantasista Doll (2013)
- Meganebu! (2013)
- Yowamushi Pedal (2013)
- Engaged to the Unidentified (2014)
- One Week Friends (2014)
- Haikyū!! (2014)
- Ao Haru Ride (2014)
- Blood Blockade Battlefront (2015)
- Chaos Dragon (2015)
- Monster Musume (2015)
- Himouto! Umaru-chan (2015)
  - Himouto! Umaru-chan R (2017)
- Grimgar of Fantasy and Ash (2016)
- She and Her Cat: Everything Flows (2016)
- My Hero Academia (2016)
- Three Leaves, Three Colors (2016)
- Orange (2016)
- Touken Ranbu: Hanamaru (2016)
  - Zoku Touken Ranbu: Hanamaru (2018)
  - Toku Touken Ranbu: Hanamaru ~Setsugetsuka~ (2022)
- Little Witch Academia (2017)
- Godzilla: Planet of the Monsters (2017)
- Sakura Quest (2017)
- Land of the Lustrous (2017)
- Teasing Master Takagi-san (2018)
- Uma Musume: Pretty Derby (2018)
- Hanebado! (2018)
- Godzilla: City on the Edge of Battle (2018)
- Run with the Wind (2018)
- Anima Yell! (2018)
- FLCL Progressive (2018)
- FLCL Alternative (2018)
- Godzilla: The Planet Eater (2018)
- Fairy Gone (2019)
- Dr. Stone (2019)
- Business Fish (2019)
- Beastars (2019)
- Azur Lane (2019)
- Drifting Dragons (2020)
- BNA: Brand New Animal (2020)
- Great Pretender (2020)
- Dorohedoro (2020)
- Jujutsu Kaisen (2020)
- Mushoku Tensei (2021)
- Seven Knights (2021)
- Godzilla Singular Point (2021)
- Spy × Family (2022)
- The Angel Next Door Spoils Me Rotten (2023)
- Chibi Godzilla Raids Again (2023)
- Frieren: Beyond Journey's End (2023)
- The Apothecary Diaries (2023)
- Bucchigiri?! (2024)
- Kaiju No. 8 (2024)
- Snowball Earth (2026)

=== Theater ===
Toho has produced revivals and original works. Years shown refer to when they staged each piece.

- Les Miserables
- Elisabeth
- Rent
- Mozart!
- Newsies
- Spirited Away
- Moulin Rouge! (2023)
- JoJo's Bizarre Adventure (2024)
- In This Corner of the World (2024)

=== Video games ===
- Cliff Hanger

In more recent years and for a period, it has produced video games. One of its first video games was the 1990 NES game titled Circus Caper. Later, it followed with a series of games based on Godzilla and a 1992 game called Serizawa Nobuo no Birdy Try. It also published games such as Super Aleste (Space Megaforce in North America). They even worked with Bandai on Dr. Jekyll and Mr. Hyde, released in Japan in 1988 and in the United States in 1989.

== Significant employees ==
dates as company employee

- Akira Kurosawa (1937–1966)
- Isao Matsuoka (1957–2009) – Longtime president and chairman of Toho.
- Iwao Mori (1937–1976)
- Eiji Tsuburaya (1937–1969)
- Tomoyuki Tanaka (1941–1947; 1952–1997) – Creator of Godzilla; President, CEO, and Chairman of Toho Studios
- Ishirō Honda (1942–1975)

== Toho Cinderella Audition ==
The Toho Cinderella Audition is an audition to discover new young actresses, first held in 1984 and irregularly held since then. It is considered one of Japan's "Big Three Actress Auditions", along with Oscar Promotion's National Bishōjo Contest and Horipro's Talent Scout Caravan.

No.	Year	The Grand Prix	Special Jury Prize	Other Awards	Notable Finalists
1	1984	Yasuko Sawaguchi	Minako Fujishiro		Yuki Saito
2	1987	Megumi Odaka	Maki Mizuno		
3	1991	Keiko Imamura	Sayaka Ōsawa		
4	1996	Maho Nonami	Misato Tanaka; Asami Yamamoto		
5	2000	Masami Nagasawa	Chihiro Otsuka		
6	2006	Manami Kurose	Yūko Masumoto; Ayaka Ikezawa		Aki Asakura; Haruka Tomatsu
7	2011	Moka Kamishiraishi	Mone Kamishiraishi; Narumi Akizuki; Junna Matsushima; Hirona Yamazaki	Ryō Ogawa (New Generation Award); Minami Hamabe (New Generation Award)	Kokoro Aoshima
8	2016	Riko Fukumoto	Yuria Kakizawa; Hina Suzuki; Amane Kamiya; Neo Inoue	Yu Motoyama (repipi armario Award); Xai (Artist Award)	
9	2022	Noa Shiroyama	Airi Nishikawa	Kōe Odani (Men's category "Toho New Face"); Honoha Yamato (Musical Award)	Riana Hirano

== Headquarters ==
Toho's headquarters, the Toho Hibiya Building (東宝日比谷ビル, Tōhō Hibiya Biru), are in Yūrakuchō, Chiyoda, Tokyo. The company moved into its current headquarters in April 2005.

== See also ==
- TohoScope
- Shintoho
- Tsuburaya Productions
- Daiei Film
- Kadokawa Daiei Studio
- Nikkatsu
- Shochiku
- Toei Company
- Toei Animation Company, Ltd.
- Studio Ghibli
- Gainax
- Group TAC
- Bandai Visual
- Studio Ponoc
- Oriental Light & Magic
- Studio Chizu
- Sunrise
- Level-5 Inc.
- TMS Entertainment, Inc.
- Benesse
- Shin-Ei Animation
- Madhouse, Inc.
- Topcraft Limited Company
