= Ichizō Kobayashi =

Japanese industrialist (1873–1957)

- 小林 一三
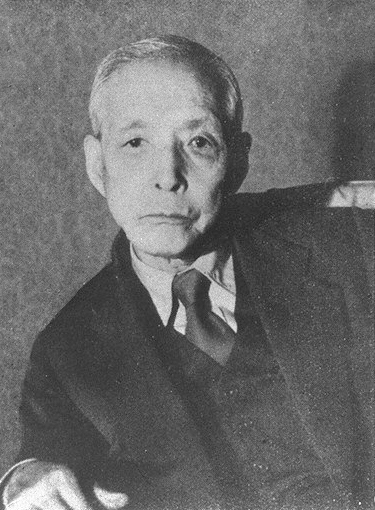

President of the War Damage Reconstruction Board
- In office 5 November 1945 – 9 March 1946
- Prime Minister: Kijūrō Shidehara
- Preceded by: Position established
- Succeeded by: Mikishi Abe

Minister of Commerce and Industry
- In office 22 July 1940 – 4 April 1941
- Prime Minister: Fumimaro Konoe
- Preceded by: Ginjirō Fujiwara
- Succeeded by: Teijirō Toyoda

Member of the House of Peers
- In office 4 April 1941 – 14 May 1946 Nominated by the Emperor

Personal details
- Born: January 3, 1873 Nirasaki, Yamanashi, Japan
- Died: January 25, 1957 (aged 84) Ikeda, Osaka, Japan
- Party: Independent
- Relatives: Shichiroku Tanabe (half-brother); Shinichi Torii (grandson); Isao Matsuoka (grandson); Shuzo Matsuoka (great-grandson)
- Education: Keio University
- Known for: Founder of the Hankyu Hanshin Toho Group
- Awards: Senior Third Rank; Order of the Sacred Treasure

Ichizō Kobayashi (小林 一三, Kobayashi Ichizō; January 3, 1873 – January 25, 1957), occasionally referred to by his pseudonym Itsuō (逸翁), was a Japanese industrialist and politician. He is best known as the founder of Hankyu Railway, the Takarazuka Revue, and Toho. He served as Minister of Commerce and Industry between 1940 and 1941.

== Life ==
Ichizō Kobayashi was born in Kawarabe village, Koma, Yamanashi Prefecture (present-day Nirasaki, Yamanashi) on January 3, 1873, to a wealthy merchant family known by the trade name "Nunoya". His mother died shortly after his birth and his father left the family, leaving Kobayashi under the care of his uncle's family. His father later remarried, was adopted into his new wife's family, and produced Kobayashi's half-brothers, Shichiroku and Munehide, who would go on to become a member of the National Diet and Japanese boxing commissioner respectfully.

He was named Ichizō, meaning "one-three", because of his birthday, January 3. He graduated from Keio Gijuku in 1892.

After a 14-year career at the Mitsui Bank, he founded (technically as one of the promoters/executive directors) Mino-o Arima Electric Railway Company (then Hankyu Corp., now, Hankyu Hanshin Holdings, Inc.) in 1907. At Hankyu, Kobayashi made success in the management of the railway in a less-populated region by developing residential areas and an amusement park along the railway line as well as a department store at the railway terminal. He also established the Takarazuka Revue and the Hankyu professional baseball team (the predecessors of Orix Buffaloes) to attract passengers. Such a business model established by Kobayashi was followed by other railway companies in Japan. He was named to the Japanese Baseball Hall of Fame in 1968.

While he demonstrated expertise in railway management, he lacked understanding of subway systems.

He staunchly opposed Hajime Seki (Mayor of Osaka), who advanced the subway project as part of Osaka City's transportation plan, arguing, "If you build subways in earthquake-prone Japan, it will tarnish your name, Mr. Seki." He also claimed, "The railway business in Osaka City will inevitably go bankrupt," and expressed concerns that "the construction will become a relic of the Showa era, an anachronistic example." In the end, his prediction was proven wrong, and the Osaka Metro became an indispensable part of Osaka City's transportation system.

Additionally, when extending his company's Kobe Line to Sannomiya, he insisted on an elevated line, in contrast to Hanshin Electric Railway, which opted for an underground route. As a result, he drew criticism from the city of Kobe, causing a 15-year delay in extending the line into the city center.

Later, Kobayashi was president of council of Tokyo Gasu Denki Kōgyō (Tokyo Gas Electric Engineering Company). He was appointed in charge of the Ministry of Commerce and Industry in the 1940 Konoe Cabinet.

After the end of World War II, he was appointed minister of state in the Shidehara cabinet and became president of the War Damage Reconstruction Board (戦災復興院, Sensai-fukkō-in), but he was soon purged due to his prewar political career. The purge was lifted in 1951.

Kobayashi died in January 1957. The Itsuō Art Museum in Ikeda, Osaka opened in October 1957 and is dedicated for his art collection.

== Kobayashi diplomatic mission, September 1940 ==
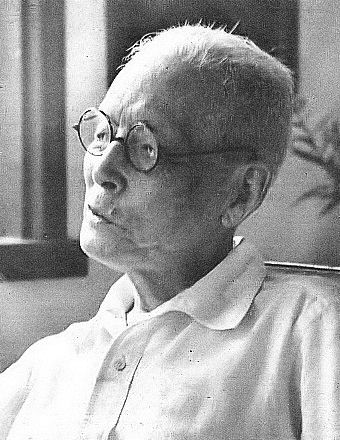
Kobayashi in 1951

Ichizō Kobayashi was commissioned by the Ministry of Foreign Affairs to lead a diplomatic mission to the Dutch East Indies in 1940. Negotiations were for a new agreement on Dutch oil. On September 12, 1940, a Japanese delegation of 24, led by Kobayashi as the Minister of Commerce and Industry, arrived in Batavia to renegotiate political and economic relations between Japan and the Dutch East Indies. Included were six high-ranking military officers, one of them Rear Admiral Tadashi Maeda.

The Dutch Embassy in Japan did not actively take part, although the Dutch Ambassador in Tokyo, J .C. Pabst, had already received the first list of Japanese economic demands in June 1940. Later, all further negotiations were conducted via the Dutch colonial administration in Batavia and Sukabumi, and received support from the Japanese Consulate General, in the persons of Matatoshi Saito (before 1941) and later by Yutaka Ishizawa.

Their first demand was an increase of petrol exports to Japan from the existing 570,000 tons in 1939 to 3,750,000 tons, about 50% of the total Dutch East Indies production. The Dutch answered that existing obligations would only permit an increase to about 1,800,000 tons. Kobayashi initially accepted this proposal, but was soon recalled to Japan on October 2, 1940.

In the book Day of Deceit: The Truth About FDR and Pearl Harbor written by Robert Stinnett:

The heated diplomatic interchanges between Kobayashi and van Mook (H.J. van Mook, Dutch minister) were in sharp contrast to the peaceful surroundings. Japan's diplomats angrily contended that the Netherlands delegates were mere puppets of Washington. On the table were proposals involving Japanese rights to obtain oil and petroleum products from the Netherlands' enormous reserves in the Dutch East Indies. Japan called for the Dutch to provide a minimum of 3,150,000 metric tons of petroleum annually. One of the delegates, Japanese minister of commerce Ichizō Kobayashi, demanded that the Dutch guarantee a delivery schedule covering a five-year period. Kobayashi expressed the attitude of his government: The Netherlands has been closely co-operating with United Kingdom and the United States. Now is the time to shake hands with Japan.

Another diplomatic commission was then led by Kenkichi Yoshizawa.

== Family tree ==
KOBAYASHI (小林) Family Tree

BABA Sanemon; Ibaraki Bank	MATSUOKA Shuzo; Matsuoka Kisen (1859-1929)	KOBAYASHI Ikuko (died ~1873)	TANABE Shichibei (adopted into TANABE family); Sake Brewer (1848-??)	TANABE
MATSUOKA Junkichi (Baba Keizo); House of Peers (1888–1951)	MATSUOKA Chieko	KOBAYASHI Ichizō; Hankyu Railways (1873–1957)	TANABE Shichiroku; House of Representatives (1879-1952)	TANABE Munehide; Boxing Commissioner (1881-1957)
MATSUOKA Setsuko	MATSUOKA Tatsuo (Kobayashi); Toho Co. (1904-1974)	KOBAYASHI Yonezo; Keihanshin Railway (1909-1969)	KOBAYASHI Haruko (Married TORII Kichitaro) (1912-2011)	Kichitarō Torii (1908-1940)
SHIZUKA Chinami; Takarazuka Revue	MATSUOKA Isao; Toho Co. (1934-)	KOBAYASHI Kimiko (Husband Kohei adopted by Yonezo)	TORII Shinichi; Suntory (1938–2004)
TSUJI Toshiko (Married TSUJI Yoshiki)	MATSUOKA Hiroyasu; Toho Co. (1966-)	MATSUOKA Shuzo; Tennis Pro (1967-)	TAGUCHI Emiko; TV presenter (1966-)	TORII Nobuhiro; Suntory (1966-)
TSUJI Takayasu (1995-); Rugby Pro	KISHOU Kazuto; Takarazuka Revue
