= Matsuoka Museum of Art =

- 松岡美術館
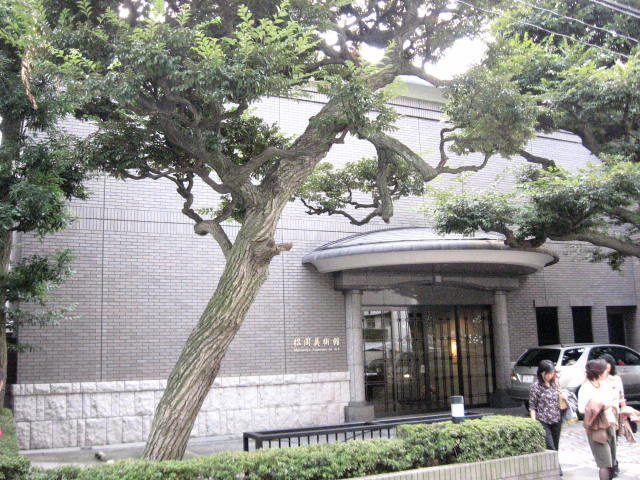
- Interactive map of the Matsuoka Museum of Art area

General information
- Location: 5 Chome-12-6 Shirokanedai, Minato, Tokyo, Japan
- Coordinates: 35°38′24″N 139°43′18″E
- Opened: 1975
- Renovated: 2020

Website
- www.matsuoka-museum.jp

The Matsuoka Museum of Art is a private museum located in Shirokanedai, Minato, Tokyo, founded by Japanese developer Seijiro Matsuoka in November 1975.

The museum took advantage of the COVID-19 pandemic to close for renovations, reopening on 26 January 2022 with an exhibition featuring many of the original pieces acquired by Matsuoka himself, and form the basis of the museum's collection.

== Summary ==
The Museum initially opened in Shinbashi, but was moved to the site of Seijiro Matsuoka's private residence following his passing in April 2000.

Seijiro Matsuoka (1894–1989), was a real estate developer who initially made his fortune as a jewelry dealer in the 1920s, then expanded his fortune through real estate holdings in office buildings, frozen food storage, and hotels following World War 2. He was known as a collector of Chinese ceramics, Gandhara Indian sculptures, Impressionist paintings, sculptures, and antiquities.

Acquisition of a significant Ming era Jingdezhen porcelain bottle from Sotheby's in 1974 for the then record price of £420,000 (250 million yen in Japanese yen at the time) convinced Matsuoka of the need to establish a museum to share his collection with the public.

The collection includes contemporary sculptures by Bourdelle and Henry Moore, Gandhara stone sculptures and medieval Hindu sculptures, oriental ceramics from China, Korea, Japan and Vietnam, Japanese paintings from Muromachi ink paintings to Showa, Renoir, Modigliani, and modern French paintings such as Vlaminck.

== Notable works ==
Western paintings
Claude Monet, Country Road in Normandy, 1868
Pierre-Auguste Renoir, Portrait of Lucien Daudet, pastel, 1879
Eugène Boudin, Pilot of the Sea, 1884
Armand Guillaumin, The Rocks of Agay, 1893
Hippolyte Petitjean, Landscape with Nymph, 1901
Camille Pissarro, Afternoon of the Carousel Bridge, 1904
Henry Moret, Whirlpools, Finistère, 1911
Amedeo Modigliani, Bust of a Young Woman (Lady Martha), circa 1916-7
Paul Signac, Port of Saint-Tropez, 1923
Georges Rouault, Inside Brittany, 1938
Maurice de Vlaminck, Sunset in the Forest, 1938
Albert Marquet, Port of Algiers, 1942
Paul Delvaux, Orpheus, 1956

Japanese paintings
Hokke Mandala Figure, late Heian
Takebayashi Kanaizu, paper book sumi-tansai with the appreciation of Takean Taien (Important Cultural Property)
Kano Sanraku, Oromatsu Furugi Flower and Bird Drawing Screen, Early Edo period
Maruyama Okyo, Yui Koi Waterfowl Figure Screening Screen, 1974
Ikeda Shoen and Terukata Co-operation Sakurabune and Autumn Leaves Hunting Screen, 1912
Hiroyo Terasaki Snowboard in the Sea of Spring in the Sea, 1914 Hidene Ikegami, Gangami Cormorant Folding Screen 1972

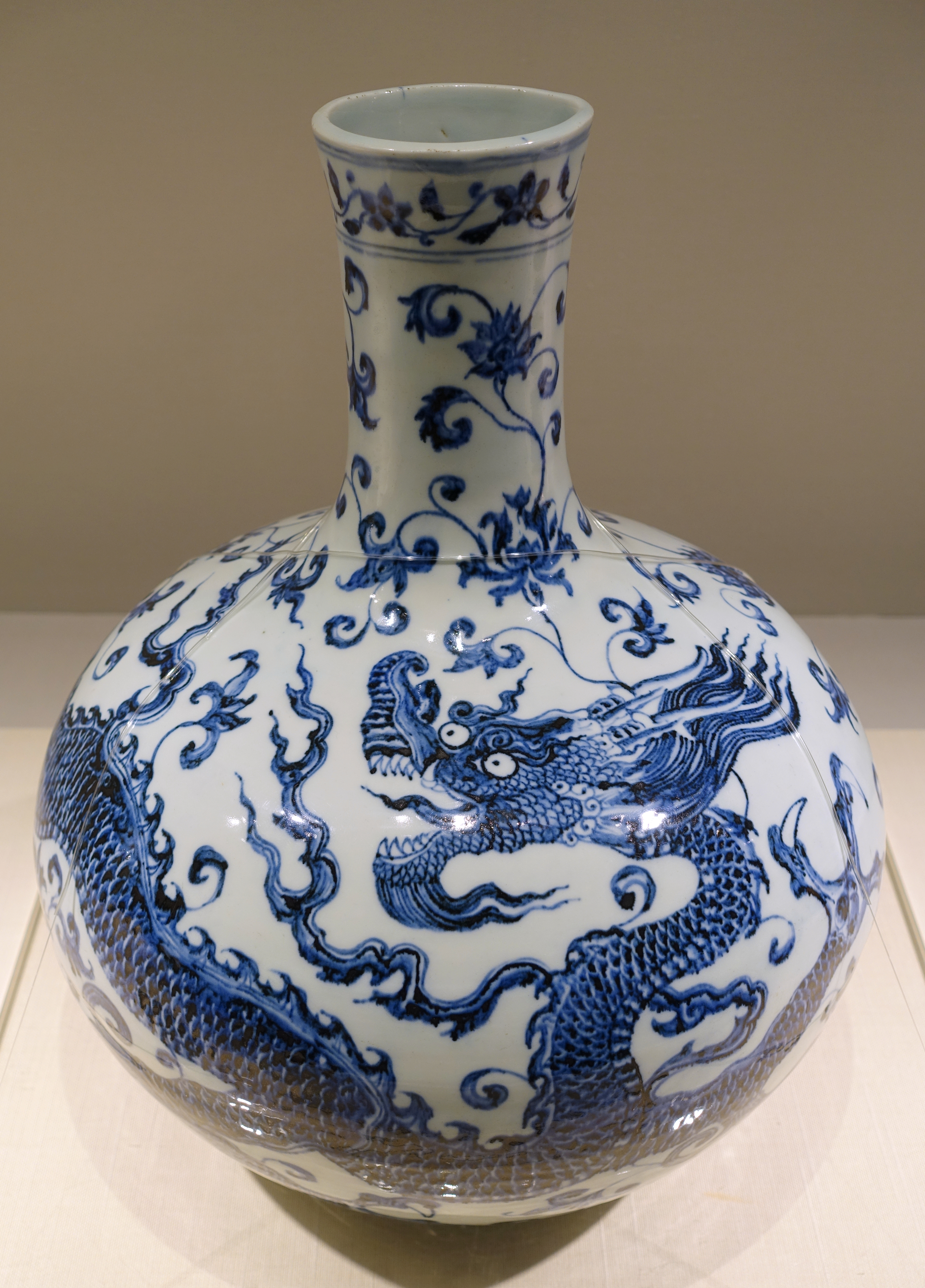
Bottle jar with dragon and arabesque design, China, Jingdezhen kiln.

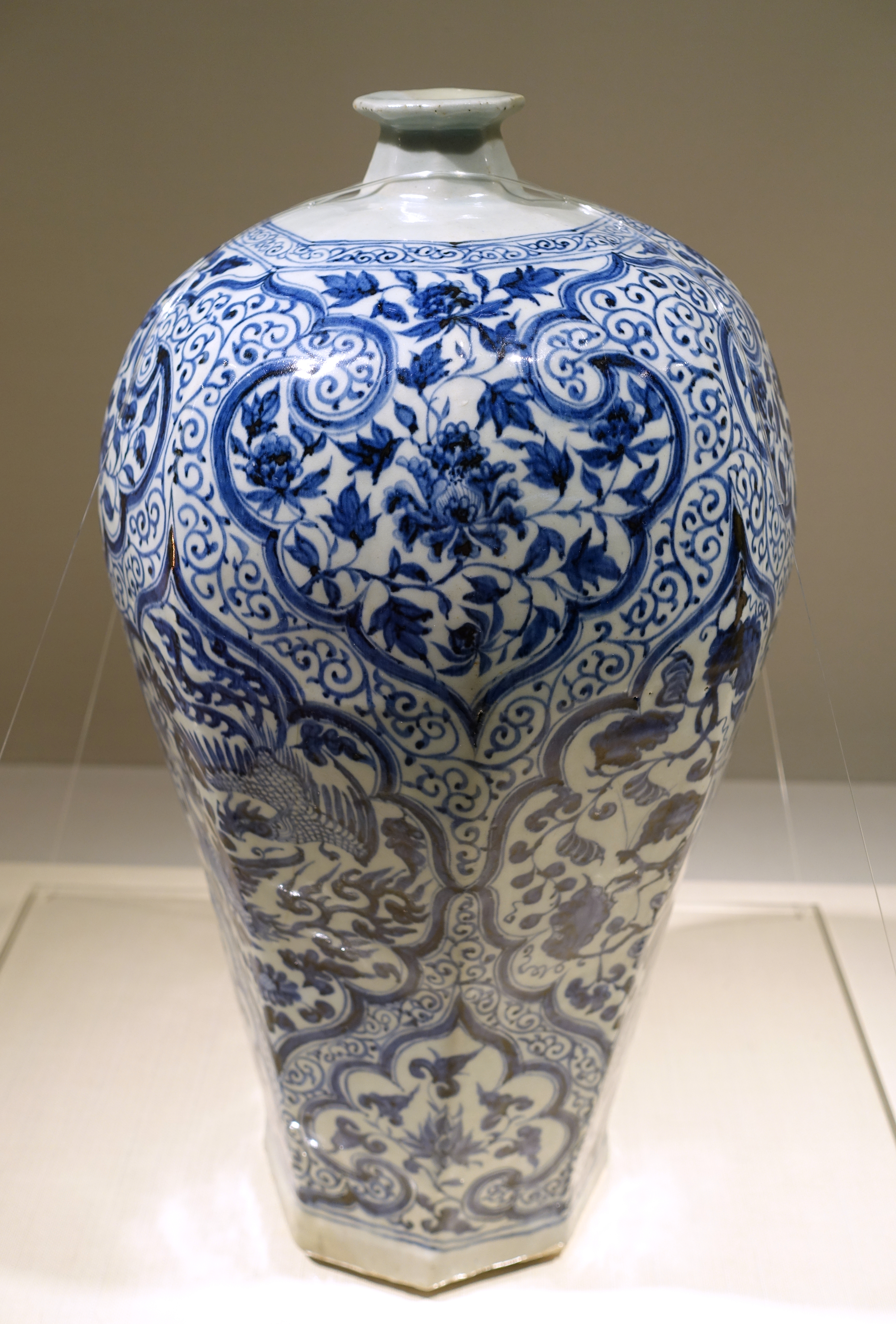
Hexagonal vase with paired phoenixes, China, Jingdezhen kiln.

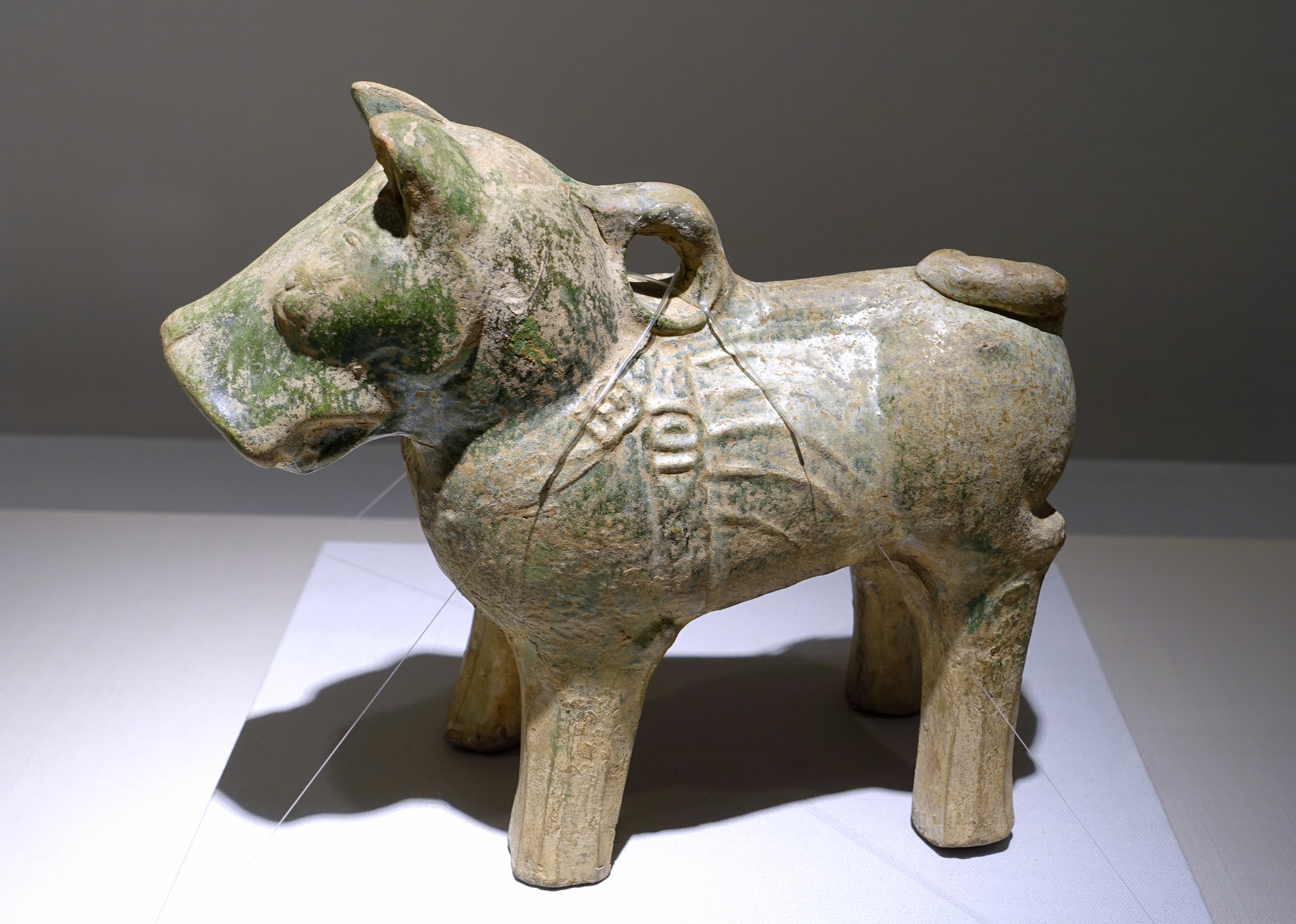
Dog figure, China, Eastern Han dynasty

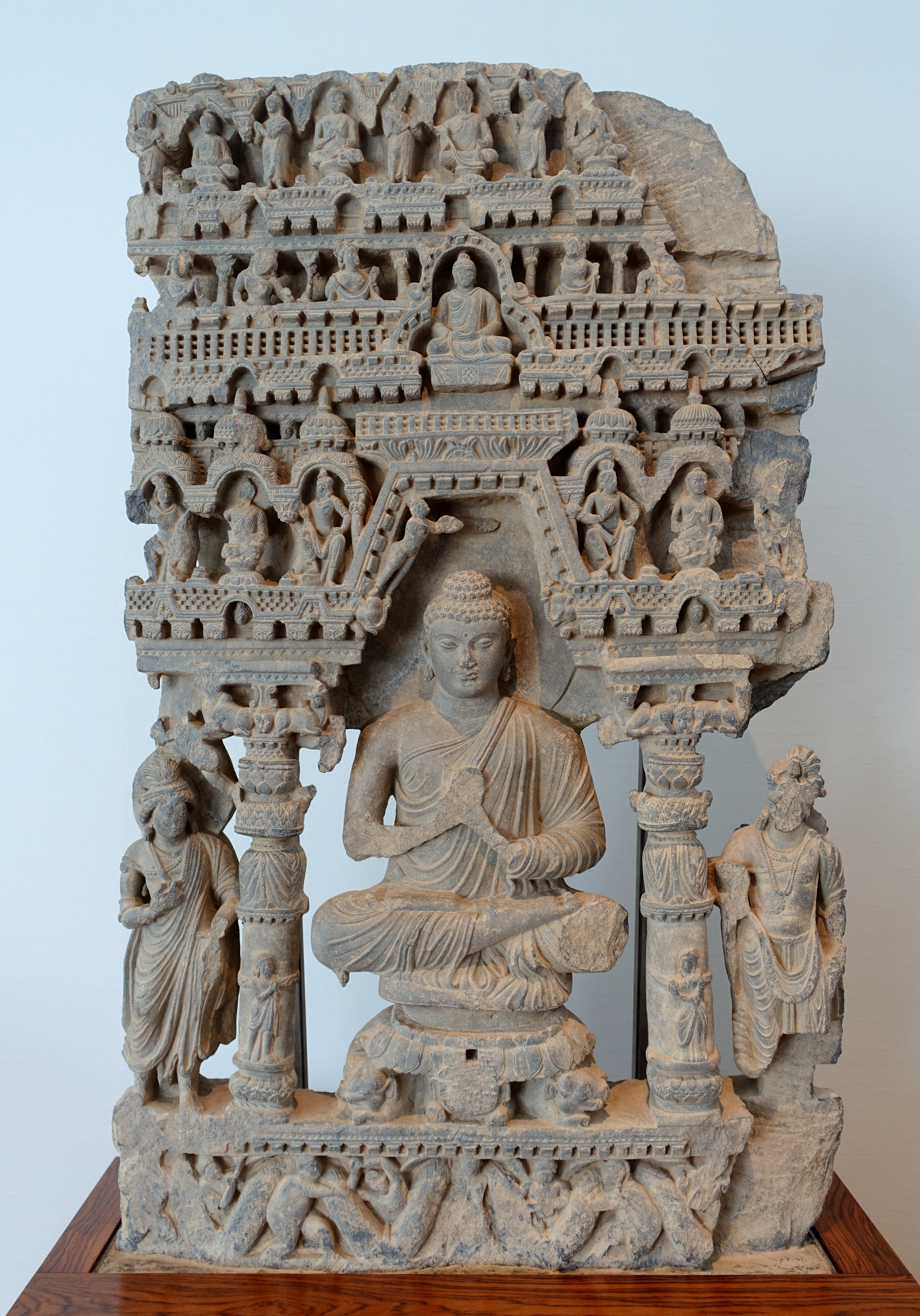
Gandhara Buddhist Relief, India, 3rd Century

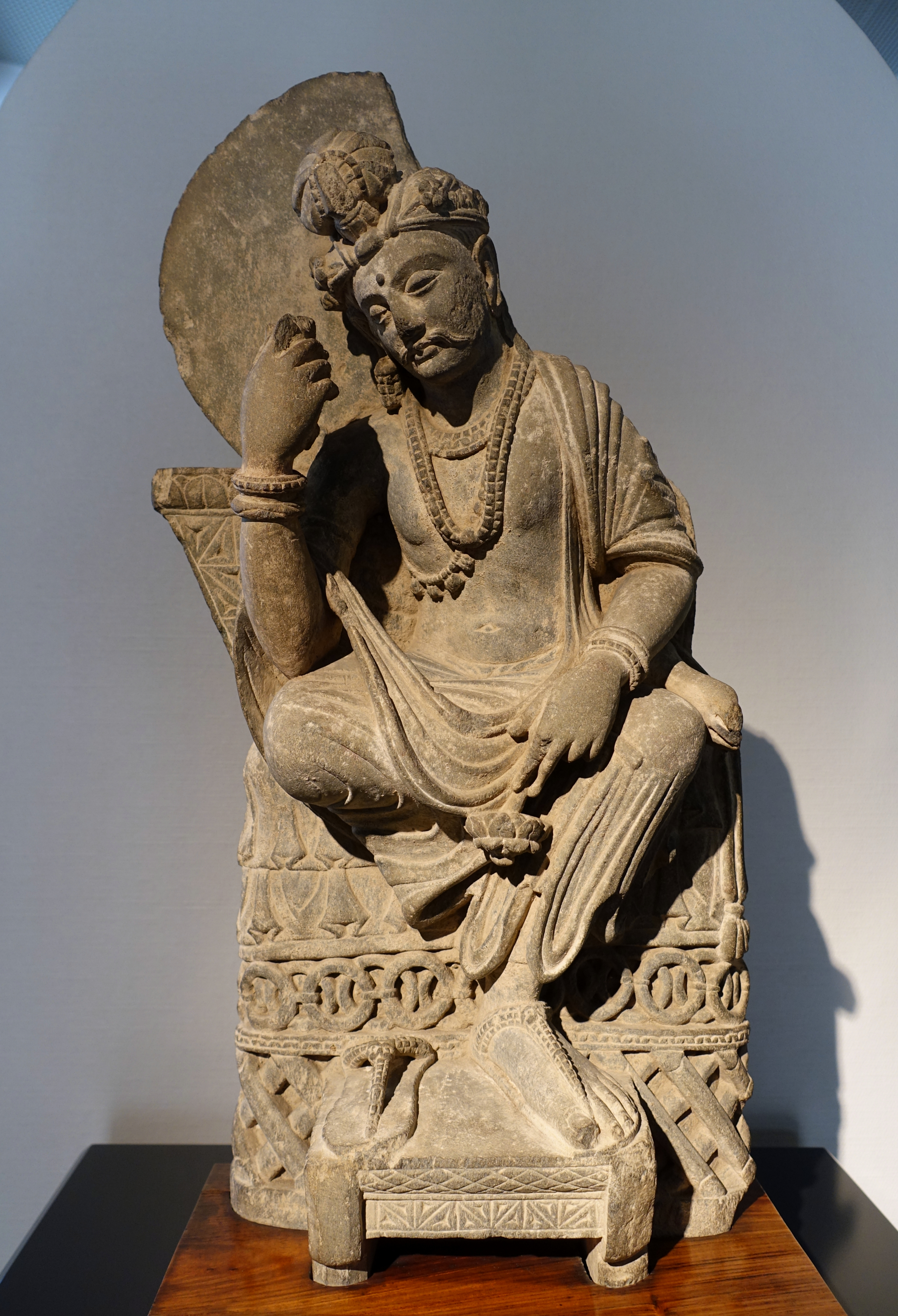
Gandhara Buddhist statue, India, 3rd Century

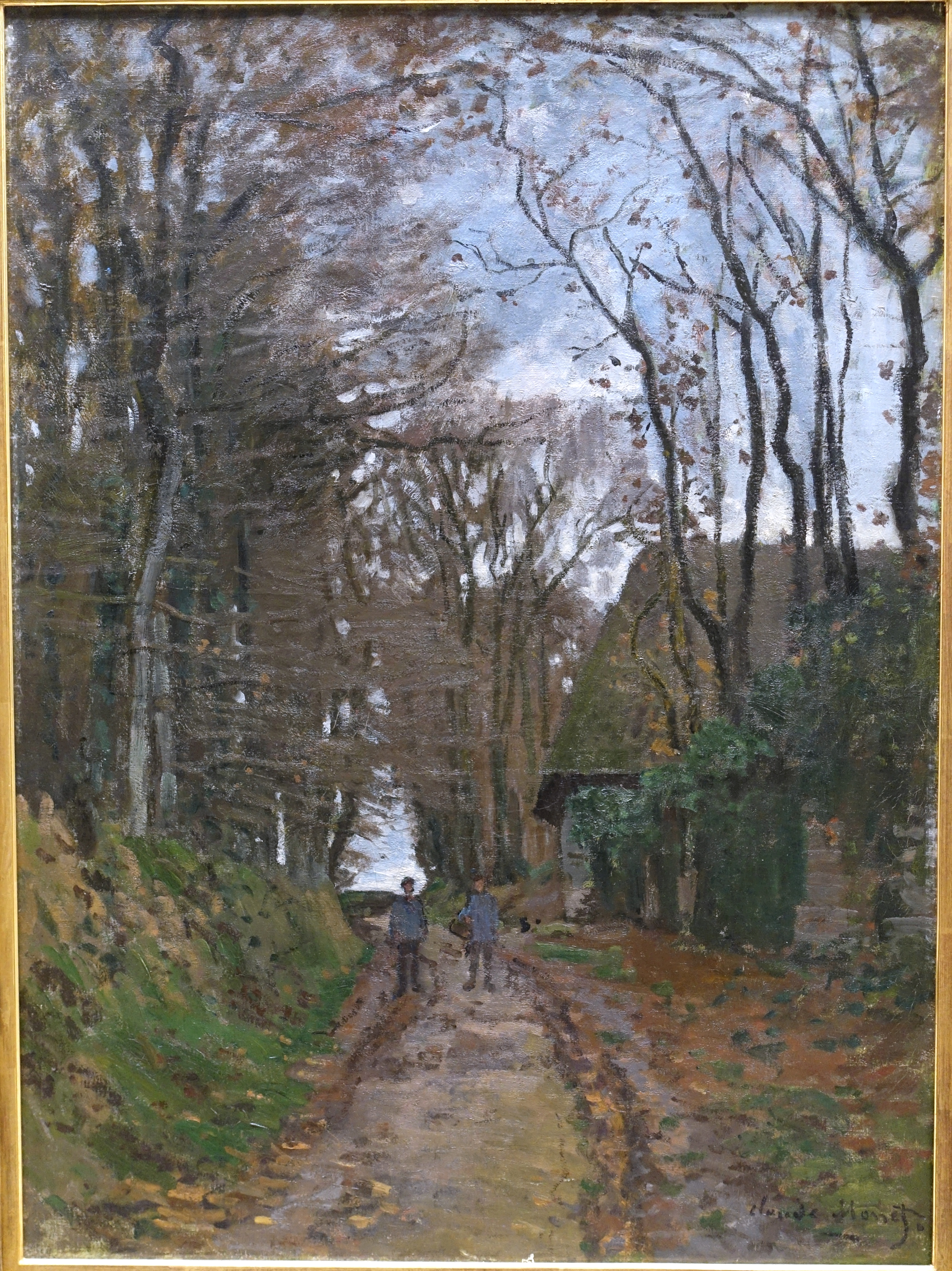
"Chemin en Normandie" by Claude Monet, 1868

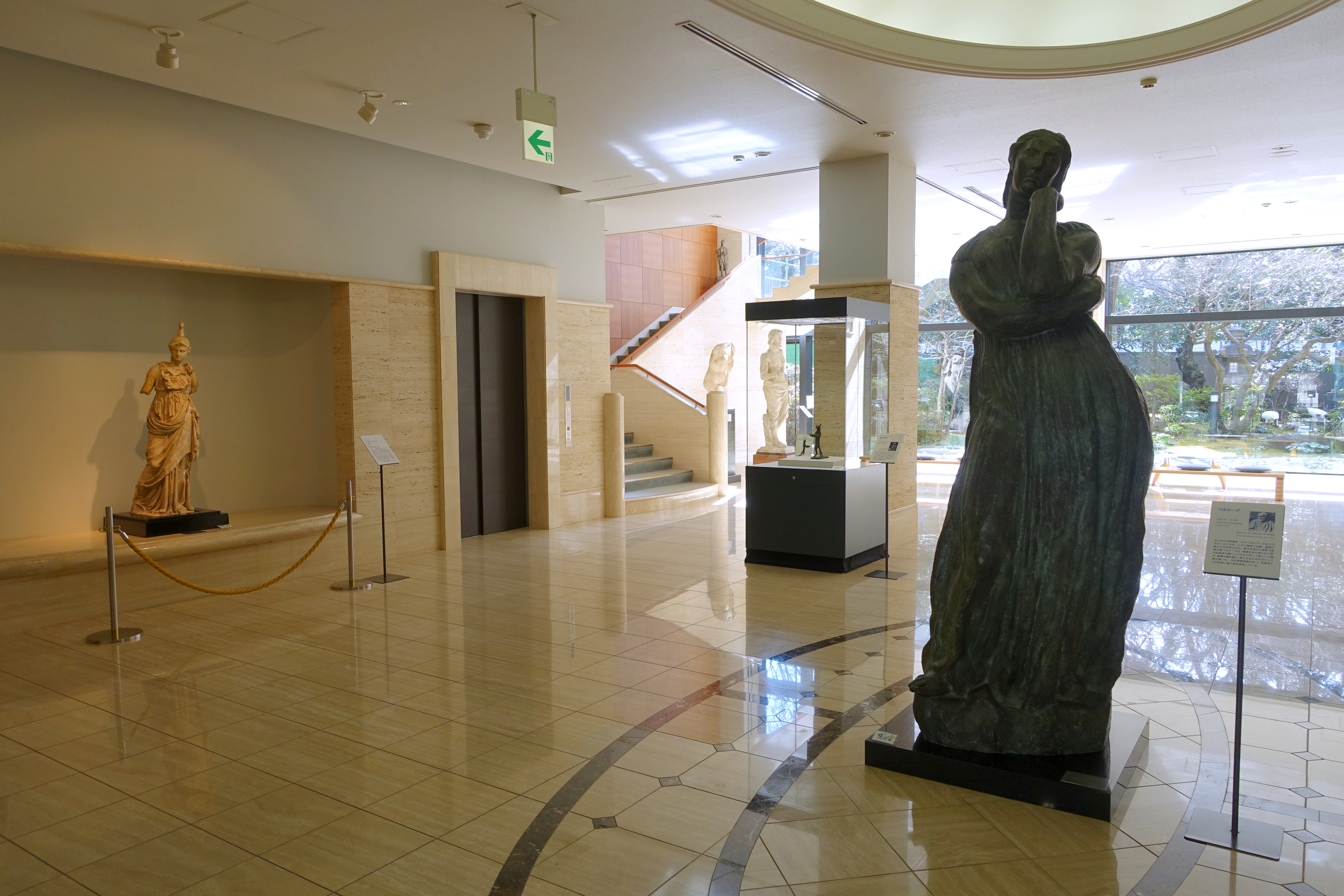
Interior view of the Museum (Boudelle's "Penelope" on the right)

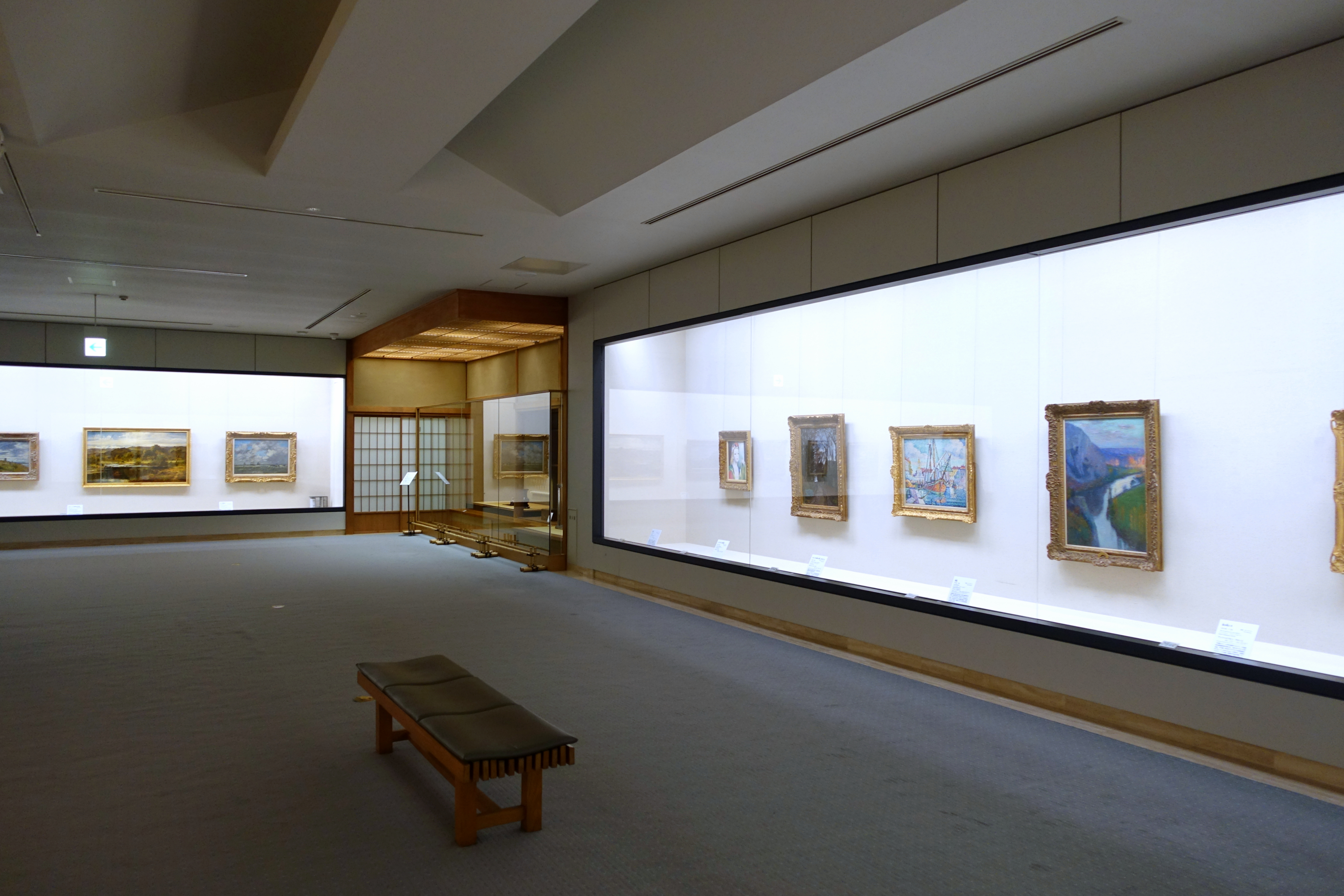
Western art at the Museum

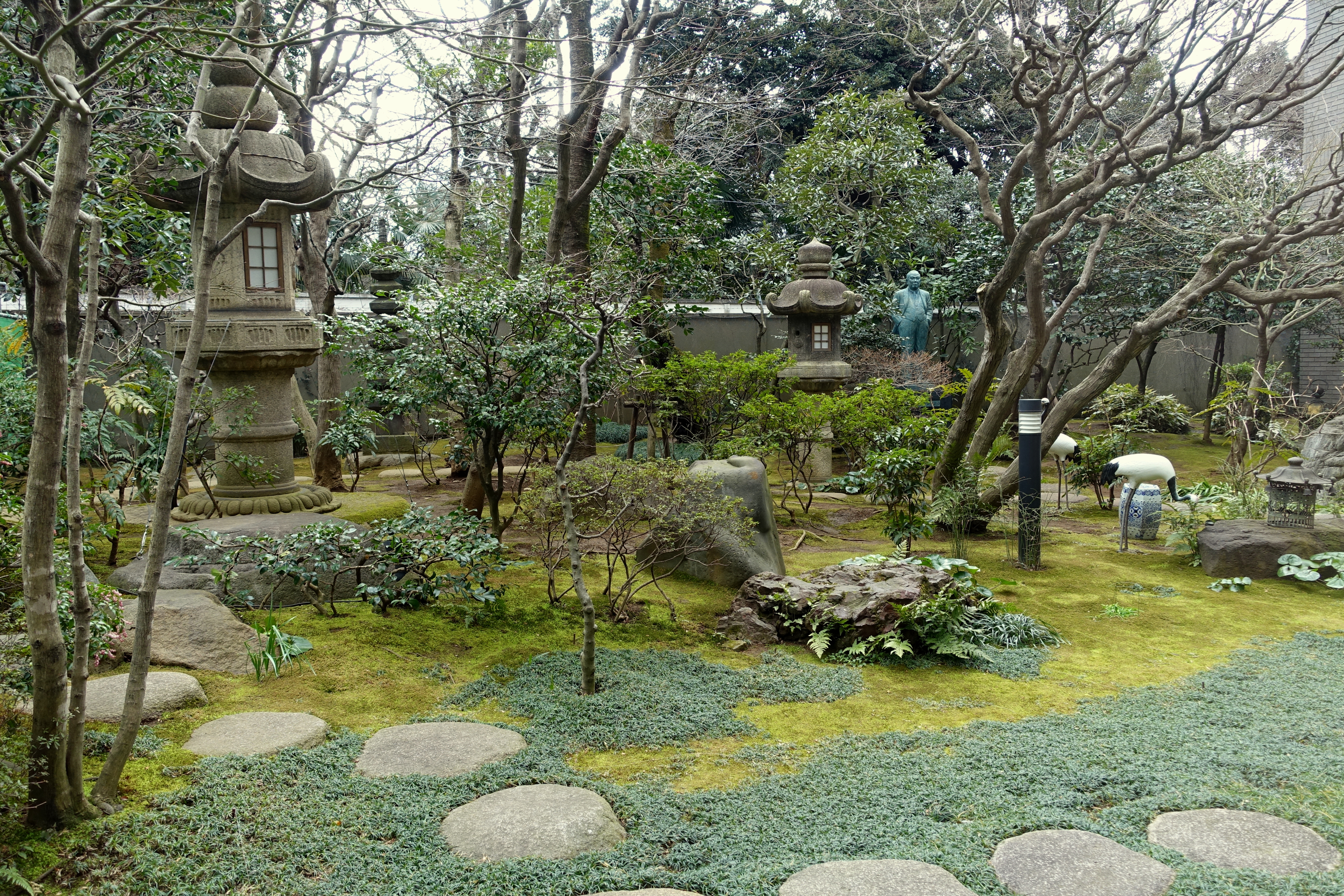
Garden view of the Museum

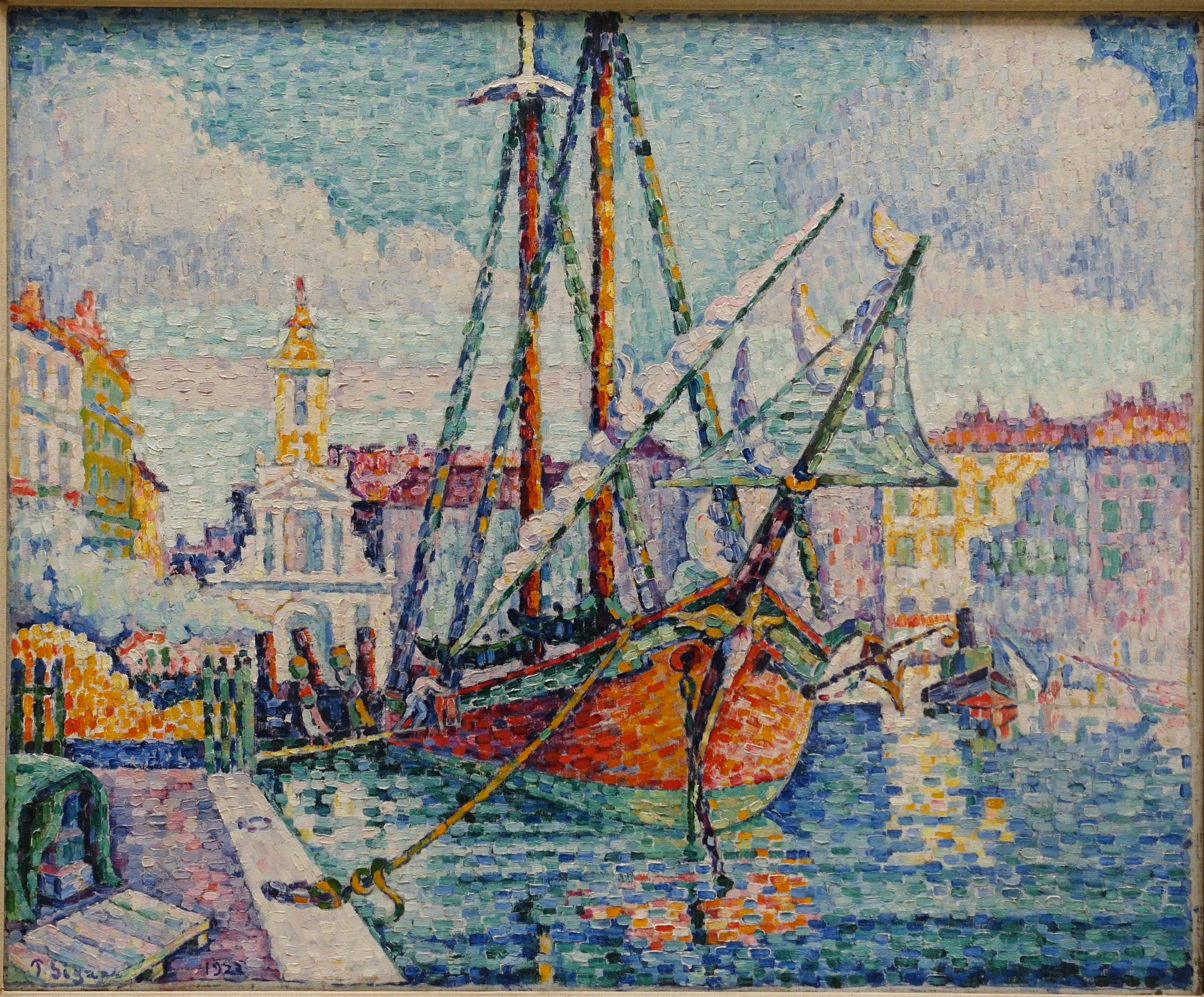
Signac's "Le bateau d'oranges", 1923

== Location ==
15 minutes walk from JR Meguro Station East Exit. 6 minutes on foot from Tokyo Metro Shirokanedai Station

== Notable exhibitions ==
- Matsuoka Museum of Art, "Tategura Nihon-cho", August 1987
- Matsuoka Museum of Art, "Toyo Ceramic Ceramics", November 1991
- Matsuoka Museum of Art, "Ancient Oriental Sculpture", January 1994
- Matsuoka Museum of Art, "Tatezo Modern Painting in France", 1995
- Matsuoka Museum of Art, "Ecole de Paris Exhibition from the French Impressionists in the Matsuoka Museum of Art", 1996
- Matsuoka Museum of Art, "Japanese painting selection", October 2006
- Matsuoka Museum of Art, "Walking with the Matsuoka Museum of Art", Norio Oyama, October 2009
- Matsuoka Museum of Art, "Reopening Memorial Exhibition: The essence of the Matsuoka Collection", 2022

== Publications ==
The museum has published a number of books about its collection and special exhibitions, including the following:

- Ancient Asian Art Sculptures From The Matsuoka Collection (1994)
- The Best Selection of My Favorite Arts of Matsuoka Collection (2016)
