= Strafing off Barber's Point =

- Part of Attack on Pearl Harbor
- Location: off Kalaeloa, Hawaii
- Date: December 8, 1941
- Target: Fishing boats
- Attack type: Strafing
- Weapon: Curtiss P-40 Warhawk
- Deaths: 6
- Injuries: 7
- Victim: 15
- Perpetrator: United States Army Air Forces
- No. of participants: 4-5
- Motive: mistaken identification

On December 8, 1941, the day following the Attack on Pearl Harbor, four fishing sampans were strafed by United States Army Air Forces aircraft off Barber's Point, Kalaeloa, Hawaii. The attack left six fishermen dead and seven wounded.

== Incident ==
The Kiho Maru, Myojin Maru, Shin-ei Maru, and the Sumiyoshi Maru had set out days before the attack on Pearl Harbor. According to one of the survivors Seiki Arakak, his sampan, the Kiho Maru, had been at sea since December 4. On the morning of December 7 he and the crew saw columns of smoke rising from Pearl Harbor and believed "something was happening."

When night fell, Oahu was abnormally dark from the wartime blackout. That night, he learned of the attack from another sampan with a radio that pulled up alongside. On December 8 the Kiho Maru set course to return to her home port of Kewalo Basin along with the three other sampans also returning to Kewalo Basin. Arakaki recalled when the four fishing boats were two miles from Barber's Point, “There were four or five Army P-40s flying over us,… Each picked out a target and attacked”. Sutematsu Kida, his son Kiichi Kida, and Kiho Uyehara were killed leaving only Arakaki alive but shot in the knee. On the Myojin Maru captained by Kaichi Okada; he, Ogawa Mataichi, and Riyozo Okogi were killed off only Sannosuke Onishi (1899–1982) survived. On the other two sampans, five were wounded and two were unscathed. A Coast Guard destroyer arrived and sent launches to connect the ship to the two crippled sampans and tow the boats the rest of the way to Kewalo Basin.

== Deaths ==
- Ogawa Mataichi
- Kaichi Okada
- Riyozo Okogi
- Sutematsu Kida
- Kiichi Kida
- Kiho Uyehara

== Aftermath ==
The seven wounded were sent to Queens Hospital and put under armed guard. Arakaki said in his AP interview he and the other fishermen had been interrogated, accused of aiding Japanese submarines and being in possession of “enemy bullets”. In retrospect the strafing was believed to be in reprisal to the Attack in Pearl Harbor being that the fishing industry was ethnically dominated by Japanese-Americans. The report stated the sampans were “returning fire.” Despite these allegations the incident was an instance of mistaken identification when the planes incorrectly identified the sampans as Japanese naval vessels.

The six men killed in the incident were recorded as casualties from the attack on Pearl Harbor.

On December 12, 1942, two other sampans off Kailua and Kohala coasts were strafed.

== In popular culture ==
- Under the Blood Red Sun by Graham Salisbury
