= USS Sotoyomo (YTM-9) =

Tugboat of the United States Navy

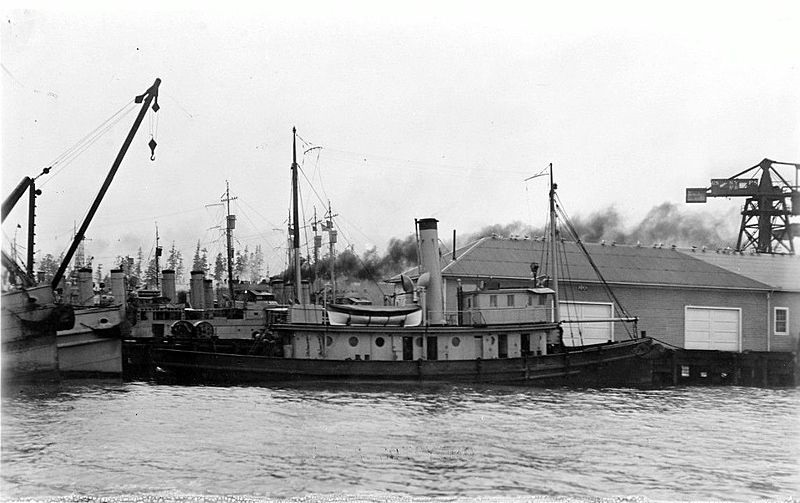
- USS Sotoyomo in Navy Yard, Puget Sound, Washington.

History

United States
- Builder: Mare Island Navy Yard, Vallejo, California
- Laid down: 2 March 1903
- Launched: 20 August 1903
- Christened: 21 April 1904
- Completed: 1 March 1904
- Commissioned: 1 July 1911
- Reclassified: YT-9 – 17 July 1920; YTM-9 – 15 May 1944
- Stricken: 26 February 1946
- Identification: Harbor Tug No.9
- Honors and awards: World War I Victory Medal; American Defense Service Medal; Combat Action Ribbon (Attack on Pearl Harbor); American Campaign Medal; Asiatic-Pacific Campaign Medal; World War II Victory Medal; 1 battle stars (World War II)
- Fate: Scuttled off Leyte, February 1946

General characteristics
- Type: Harbor tug
- Displacement: 230 tons
- Length: 97 ft (30 m)
- Beam: 21 ft 11 in (6.68 m)
- Draft: 9 ft 0 in (2.74 m)
- Installed power: one 13" x 32" steam engine one coal-fired single ended cylindrical boiler,
- Propulsion: single propeller 450shp
- Speed: 11.1 kn (20.6 km/h; 12.8 mph)
- Complement: 9

USS Sotoyomo (YTM-9/YT-9/Harbor Tug No.9) was a harbor tug built at the turn of the 20th century. She saw service in both the First World War and the Second World War and was heavily damaged by the Attack on Pearl Harbor. The name Sotoyomo commemorates a part of the Sioux tribe of Indians. Sotoyomo was the oldest vessel at Pearl Harbor in service at the time of the attack.

== History ==
Sotoyomo was laid down 2 March 1903, at Mare Island Navy Yard, Vallejo, California, she was launched 20 August 1903. She served in both World War I and World War II.

=== Attack on Pearl Harbor ===
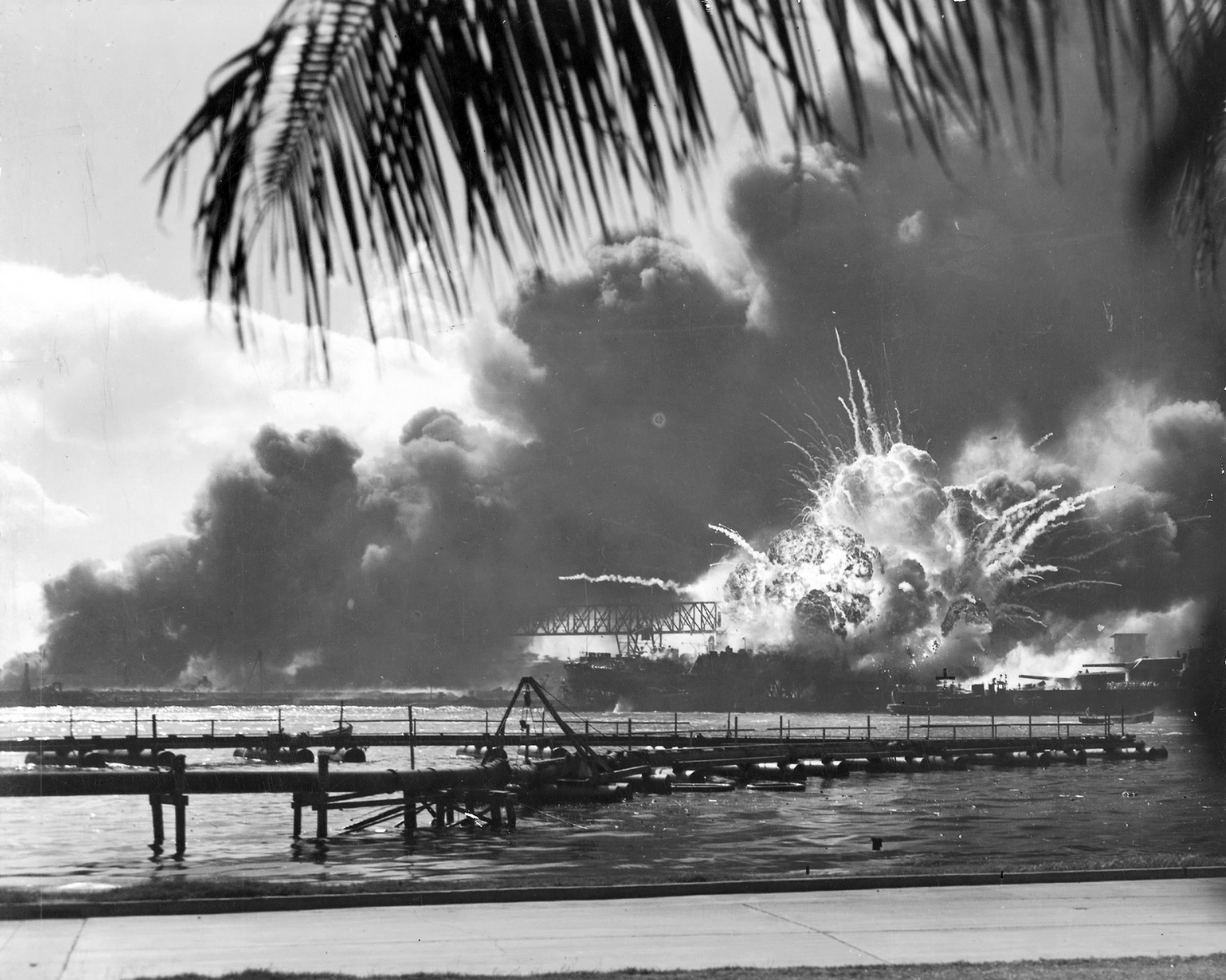
USS Sotoyomo was in the same floating dry dock when the USS Shaw exploded: 7 December 1941

Sotoyomo was in floating dry dock YFD-2 with USS Shaw undergoing overhaul when Pearl Harbor was attacked 7 December 1941. Explosions and fires on Shaw greatly damaged Sotoyomo which resulted in total submersion. Originally, Sotoyomo was deemed a total loss, but she was later refloated, repaired, and rehabilitated.

=== Further service in World War II ===
Sotoyomo served throughout World War II in various locations across the Pacific including Naval Base Noumea, Naval Base Guadalcanal and Naval Base Philippines at Naval Base Leyte. In Leyte, in September 1945, she was declared in very poor shape and taken out of service. On 15 February 1946, she was scuttled off Leyte. She was struck from the Naval Register on 26 February 1946.

== Awards ==
World War I Victory Medal
American Defense Service Medal
Combat Action Ribbon (Attack on Pearl Harbor)
American Campaign Medal
Asiatic-Pacific Campaign Medal
World War II Victory Medal

1 battle star (World War II)

== Notes ==
- "Sotoyomo I (YT-9)". Dictionary of American Naval Fighting Ships. Navy Department, Naval History and Heritage Command.
- Silverstone, Paul H. (2006). The New Navy, 1883–1922. New York: Routledge. p. 195. ISBN 0-415-97871-8.
