= Attack on Pearl Harbor =

1941 Japanese attack on the US

- Part of the Asiatic-Pacific theater of World War II
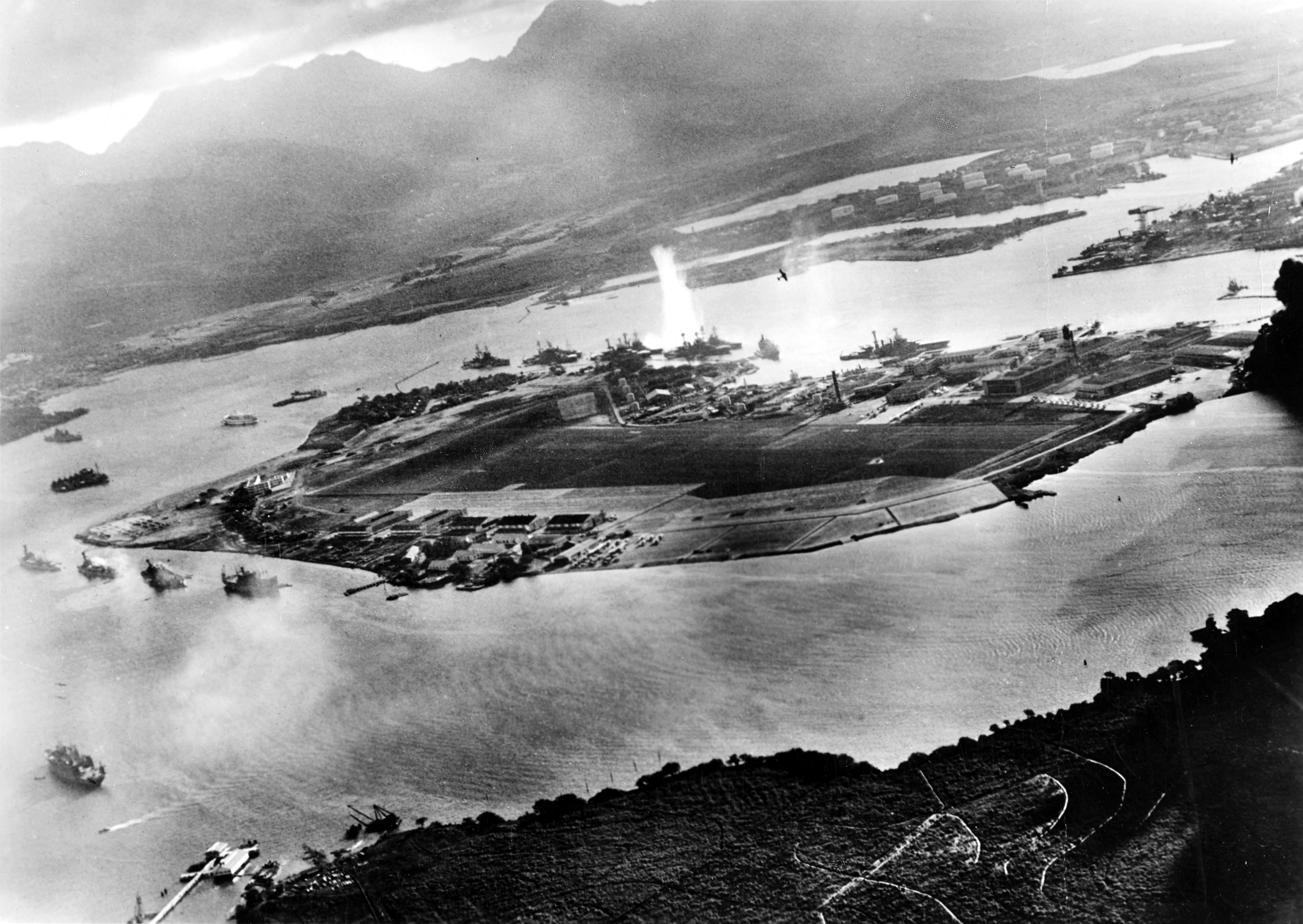
- Photograph of Battleship Row taken from a Japanese plane at the beginning of the attack. The explosion in the center is a torpedo strike on USS West Virginia. Two attacking Japanese planes can be seen: one over USS Neosho and one over the Naval Yard.
Date	December 7, 1941
Location	Oahu, Territory of Hawaii, United States 21°21′54″N 157°57′00″W
Result	Japanese victory

Belligerents
United States	Japan

Commanders and leaders
Husband E. Kimmel; Walter Short	Isoroku Yamamoto; Chūichi Nagumo

Units involved
US Pacific Fleet	1st Air Fleet

Strength
8 battleships; 8 cruisers; 30 destroyers; 4 submarines; 73 other ships (Note: Total includes USCGC Taney (WHEC-37), USCGC Reliance (WSC-150), and USCGC Tiger (WSC-152).); 390 aircraft	6 aircraft carriers; 2 battleships; 2 heavy cruisers; 1 light cruiser; 9 destroyers; 8 tankers; 23 fleet submarines; 5 midget submarines; 414 aircraft (353 took part in the raid)

Casualties and losses
4 battleships sunk; 4 battleships damaged; 1 ex-battleship sunk; 1 harbor tug sunk; 3 light cruisers damaged (Note: Unless otherwise stated, all vessels listed were salvageable.); 3 destroyers damaged; 3 other ships damaged; 188 aircraft destroyed; 159 aircraft damaged; 2,008 sailors killed; 109 Marines killed; 218 soldiers killed; 2,403 total military and civilians killed; 1,178 military and civilians wounded	4 midget submarines sunk; 1 midget submarine grounded; 29 aircraft destroyed; 74 aircraft damaged; 129 killed; 1 sailor captured
- Civilian casualties: 68 killed; 35 wounded; 3 aircraft shot down
- Location within Hawaii Attack on Pearl Harbor (Pacific Ocean)

On December 7, 1941, the Empire of Japan launched a surprise military attack on the US Pacific Fleet at its naval base at Pearl Harbor in Oahu, Hawaii. At the time, the US was a neutral country in World War II. The air raid on Pearl Harbor, which was launched from aircraft carriers, prompted the US to declare war on Japan the next day. The Japanese military leadership referred to the attack as the Hawaii Operation and Operation AI, (Note: For the Japanese designator of Oahu.) and as Operation Z during its planning.

The attack on Pearl Harbor was preceded by months of negotiations between the US and Japan over the future of the Pacific. Japanese demands included that the US end its sanctions against Japan, cease aiding China in the Second Sino-Japanese War, and allow Japan access to the resources of the Dutch East Indies. Japan dispatched its naval attack group on November 26, 1941, just before receiving the Hull note, which stated the US desire that Japan withdraw from China and French Indochina. Isoroku Yamamoto, commander of the Japanese Combined Fleet, planned the attack as a pre-emptive strike on the Pacific Fleet–which had been based at Pearl Harbor since 1940–in order to prevent it from interfering with Japan's planned actions in Southeast Asia. Yamamoto hoped that the strike would enable Japan to make rapid territorial gains and negotiate peace. In addition to Pearl Harbor, over seven hours Japan launched coordinated attacks on the US-held Philippines, Guam, and Wake Island, as well as on the British Empire in Malaya, Singapore, and Hong Kong.

The attacking force, commanded by Chūichi Nagumo, launched its attack at 7:48 a.m. Hawaiian time (6:18 p.m. GMT) on December 7, 1941. (Note: In 1941, Hawaii was half an hour different from the majority of other time zones. See UTC−10:30.) The base was struck by 353 fighters, level and dive bombers, and torpedo bombers in two waves launched from six aircraft carriers. Of the eight US battleships present, all were damaged and four were sunk. All but the USS Arizona and the USS Utah were later refloated, and six were returned to service during the war. The Japanese also sank or damaged three cruisers, three destroyers, an anti-aircraft training ship, (Note: USS Utah; the former battleship Utah was moored in the space intended to have been occupied by the aircraft carrier Enterprise which, returning with a task force, had been expected to enter the channel at 0730 on December 7; delayed by weather, the task force did not reach Pearl Harbor until dusk the following day.) and a minelayer. More than 180 US aircraft were destroyed. A total of 2,403 Americans were killed and 1,178 others were wounded. Japanese losses totaled 29 aircraft, five midget submarines, and 130 personnel. The three US carriers assigned to Pearl Harbor were at sea at the time, and important base installations, including its oil storage and naval repair facilities, were not attacked.

Japan declared war on the US and the British Empire later that day (December 8 in Tokyo), but the declarations were not delivered until the next day. On December 8, both the United Kingdom and the US declared war on Japan. On December 11, though they had no formal obligation to do so under the Tripartite Pact with Japan, Germany and Italy each declared war on the United States, which responded by declaring war on Germany and Italy. While there were historical precedents for the unannounced military action by Japan, the lack of a formal warning and perception that the attack had been unprovoked led US president Franklin D. Roosevelt to famously label December 7, 1941, "a date which will live in infamy". The attack remains the deadliest non-pathological disaster to ever happen in Hawaii, and for nearly 60 years, was the deadliest foreign attack on the US until the September 11 attacks in 2001.

== Background ==
=== Diplomacy ===
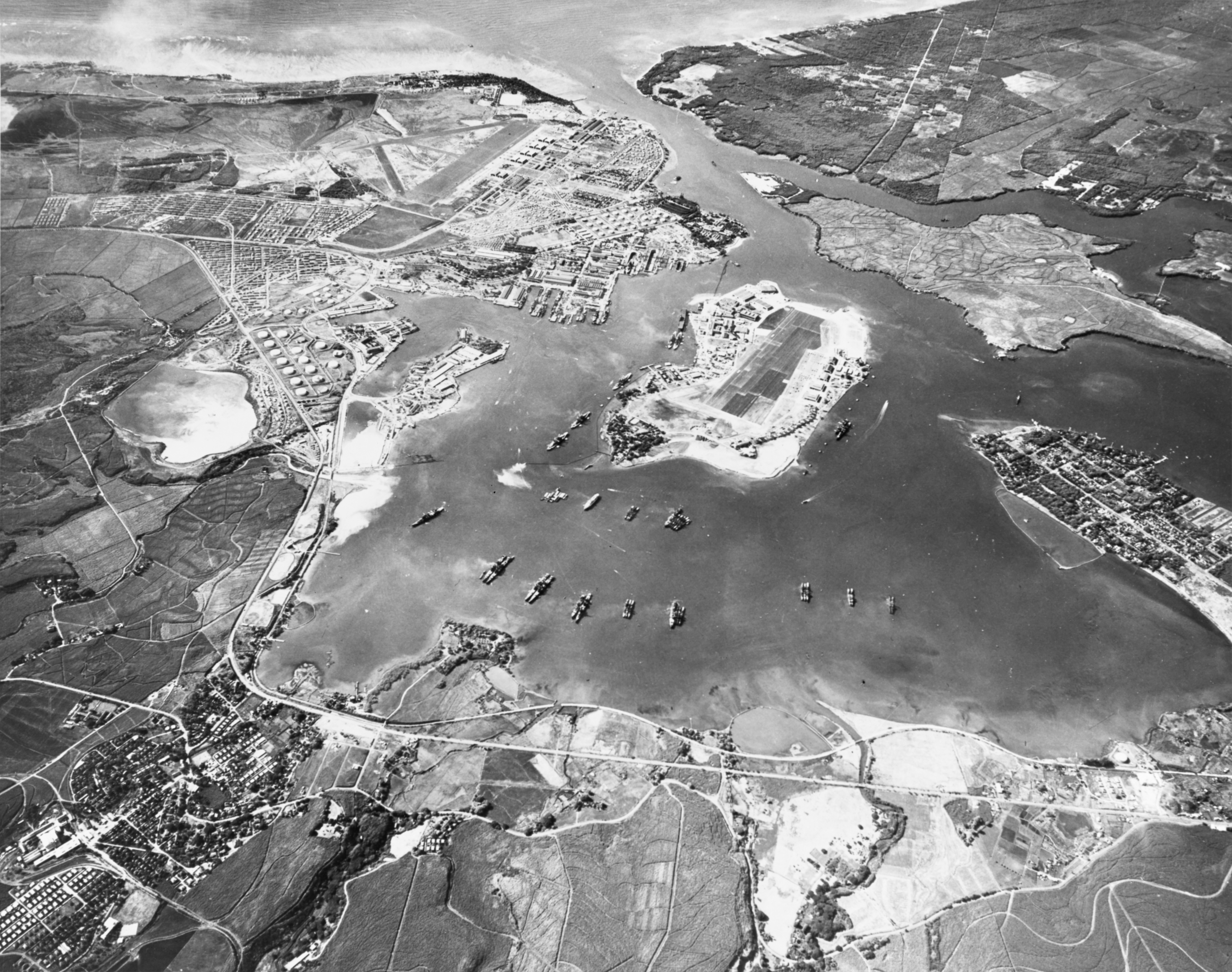
Pearl Harbor on October 30, 1941, a month before the attack, with Ford Island visible (in the center)

War between the Empire of Japan and the United States was seen as a possibility since the 1920s. Japan had been wary of American territorial and military expansion in the Pacific and Asia since the late 1890s, followed by the annexation of islands, such as Hawaii and the Philippines, which were close to or within Japan's perceived sphere of influence.

At the same time, Japanese strategic thinkers believed that Japan needed economic self-sufficiency in order to wage modern war. The experiences of World War I had taught the Japanese that modern wars would be protracted, require total mobilization, and create vulnerabilities for trade embargoes and encirclement. As a consequence, Japan needed access to strategically important resources (e.g., iron, oil) that could not be extracted at sufficient levels in the home islands.

Although Japan had begun to take a hostile stance against the United States after the rejection of the Racial Equality Proposal, their relationship was cordial enough to remain trading partners. Tensions did not seriously grow until Japan's invasion of Manchuria in 1931. Over the next decade, Japan expanded into China, leading to the Second Sino-Japanese War in 1937. Japan spent considerable effort trying to isolate China and endeavored to secure enough independent resources to attain victory on the mainland. The "Southern Operation" was designed to assist these efforts. Nevertheless, Japan would still rely heavily on US oil imports, including to Japanese forces in Japan-occupied Manchuria.

In a memorandum dated October 24, 1934, Chief of the Division of Far Eastern Affairs Stanley K. Hornbeck discussed his meeting with Standard Oil New Jersey head Walter C. Teagle to US president Franklin D. Roosevelt. The memo described Teagle as uncooperative with US recommendations, and said that Standard Oil was given special treatment by the Japanese government which made the company less subject to Japan's national business regulation policies than other companies. Hornbeck noted in the memorandum that as a result of Teagle's business dealings with Japan, "the major portion of the petroleum and petroleum products now imported into Japan is of American origin."

Starting in December 1937, events such as the Japanese attack on USS Panay, the Allison incident, and the Rape of Nanjing swung Western public opinion sharply against Japan. The United States unsuccessfully proposed a joint action with the United Kingdom to blockade Japan. In 1938, following an appeal by President Roosevelt, American companies stopped providing Japan with implements of war.

In 1940, Japan invaded French Indochina, attempting to stymie the flow of supplies reaching China. The United States halted shipments of airplanes, parts, machine tools, and aviation gasoline to Japan, which Japan perceived as an unfriendly act. (Note: After it was announced in September that iron and steel scrap export would also be prohibited, Japanese Ambassador Horinouchi protested to Secretary Hull on October 8, 1940, warning this might be considered an "unfriendly act".) The United States did not stop oil exports, however, partly because of the prevailing sentiment in Washington that given Japanese dependence on American oil, such an action was likely to be considered an extreme provocation.

In mid-1940, President Franklin D. Roosevelt moved the Pacific Fleet from San Diego to Hawaii. He also ordered a military buildup in the Philippines, taking both actions in the hope of discouraging Japanese aggression in the Far East. Because the Japanese high command was mistakenly certain any attack on the United Kingdom's Southeast Asian colonies, including Singapore, would bring the United States into the war, a devastating preventive strike appeared to be the only way to prevent American naval interference. An invasion of the Philippines was also considered necessary by Japanese war planners. The American War Plan Orange had envisioned defending the Philippines with an elite force of 40,000 men; this option was never implemented due to opposition from Douglas MacArthur, who felt he would need a force ten times that size. By 1941, American planners expected to have to abandon the Philippines at the outbreak of war. Late that year, Admiral Thomas C. Hart, commander of the United States Asiatic Fleet, was given orders to that effect.

The United States finally ceased oil exports to Japan in July 1941, following the seizure of French Indochina after the Fall of France, in part because of new American restrictions on domestic oil consumption. Because of this decision, Japan proceeded with plans to take the oil-rich Dutch East Indies. (Note: This was mainly a Japanese Navy preference; the Japanese Army would have chosen to attack the Soviet Union.) On August 17, Roosevelt warned Japan that America was prepared to take opposing steps if "neighboring countries" were attacked.

Political Map of the Asia-Pacific Region, 1939

Japan and the United States engaged in negotiations during 1941, attempting to improve relations. In the course of these negotiations, Japan offered to withdraw from most of China and Indochina after making peace with the Nationalist government. It also proposed to adopt an independent interpretation of the Tripartite Pact and to refrain from trade discrimination, provided all other nations reciprocated. Washington rejected these proposals. Japanese prime minister Konoe then offered to meet with Roosevelt, but Roosevelt insisted on reaching an agreement before any meeting. The American ambassador to Japan repeatedly urged Roosevelt to accept the meeting, warning that it was the only way to preserve the conciliatory Konoe government and peace in the Pacific. However, his recommendation was not acted upon. The Konoe government collapsed the following month when the Japanese military rejected a withdrawal of all troops from China.

Japan's final proposal, delivered on November 20, offered to withdraw from southern Indochina and to refrain from attacks in Southeast Asia, so long as the United States, United Kingdom, and Netherlands supplied one million U.S. gallons (3.8 million liters) of aviation fuel, lifted their sanctions against Japan, and ceased aid to China. The American counter-proposal of November 26 (November 27 in Japan), the Hull note, required Japan to completely evacuate China without conditions and conclude non-aggression pacts with Pacific powers. On November 26 in Japan, the day before the note's delivery, the Japanese task force left port for Pearl Harbor.

The Japanese intended the attack as a preventive action to keep the United States Pacific Fleet from interfering with their planned military actions in Southeast Asia against overseas territories of the United Kingdom, the Netherlands, and the United States. Over the course of seven hours, there were coordinated Japanese attacks on the American-held Philippines, Guam, Wake Island, Midway Atoll and on the British Empire in Malaya, Singapore, and Hong Kong. From the Japanese point of view, it was seen as a preemptive strike "before the oil gauge ran empty."

=== Military planning ===
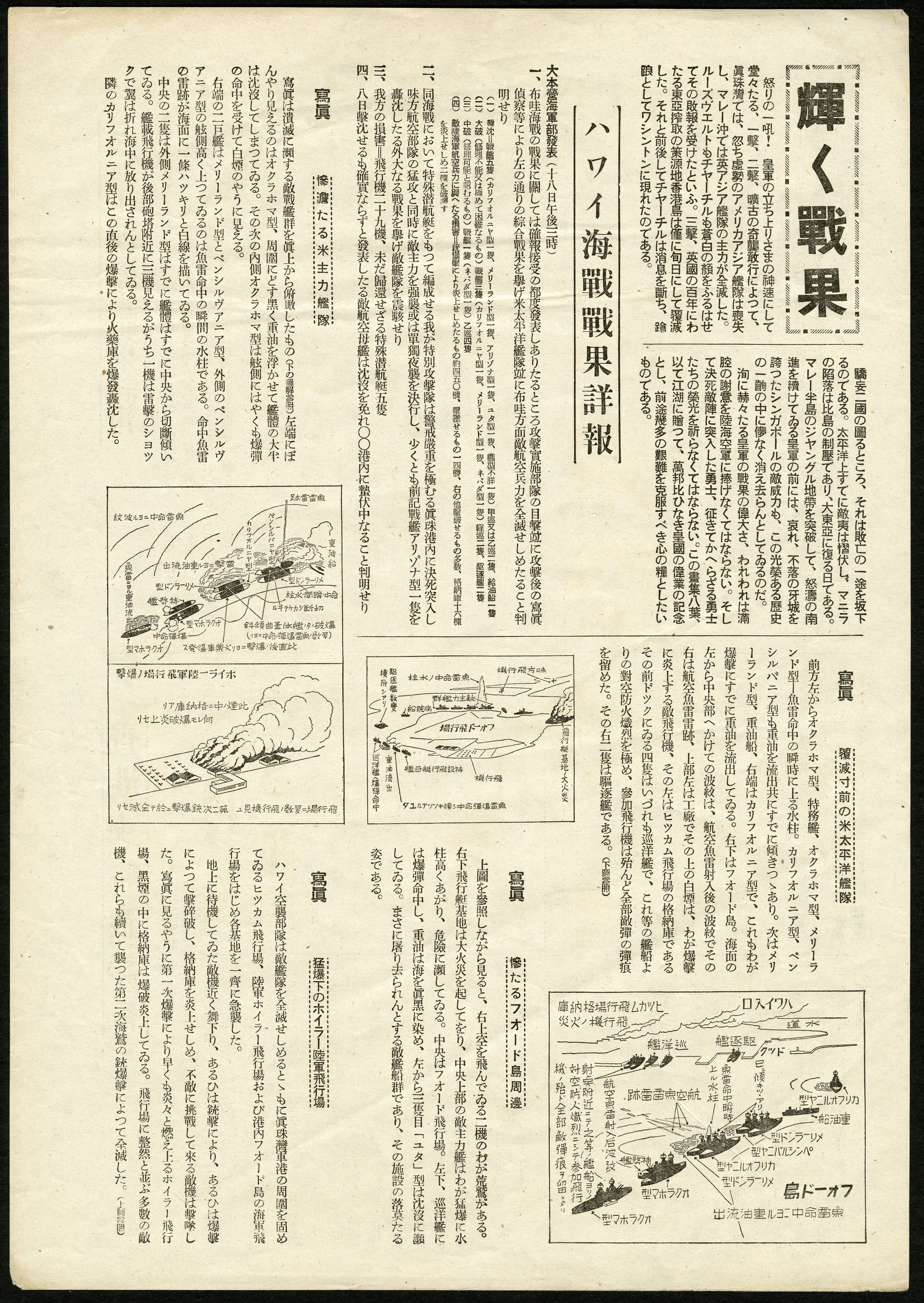
The Empire of Japan's 1941 attack plan on Pearl Harbor

Preliminary planning for an attack on Pearl Harbor to protect the move into the "Southern Resource Area", the Japanese term for the Dutch East Indies and Southeast Asia generally, began early in 1941 under the auspices of Admiral Isoroku Yamamoto, then commanding Japan's Combined Fleet. He won assent to formal planning and training for an attack from Admiral Osami Nagano, the Chief of the Imperial Japanese Navy General Staff, only after much contention with Naval Headquarters, including a threat to resign his command. Full-scale planning was underway by early spring 1941, primarily by Rear Admiral Ryūnosuke Kusaka, with assistance from Commander Minoru Genda and Yamamoto's Deputy Chief of Staff, Captain Kameto Kuroshima. The planners studied the 1940 British air attack on the Italian fleet at Taranto intensively. (Note: "The Dorn report did not state with certainty that Kimmel and Short knew about Taranto. There is, however, no doubt that they did know, as did the Japanese. Lieutenant Commander Takeshi Naito, the assistant naval attaché to Berlin, flew to Taranto to investigate the attack first hand, and Naito subsequently had a lengthy conversation with Commander Mitsuo Fuchida about his observations. Fuchida led the Japanese attack on December 7, 1941.") (Note: "A torpedo bomber needed a long, level flight, and when released, its conventional torpedo would plunge nearly a hundred feet deep before swerving upward to strike a hull. Pearl Harbor deep averages 42 feet. But the Japanese borrowed an idea from the British carrier-based torpedo raid on the Italian naval base of Taranto. They fashioned auxiliary wooden tail fins to keep the torpedoes horizontal, so they would dive to only 35 feet, and they added a breakaway "nosecone" of soft wood to cushion the impact with the surface of the water.")

Over the next several months, pilots were trained, equipment was adapted, and intelligence was collected. Despite these preparations, Emperor Hirohito did not approve the attack plan until November 5, after the third of four Imperial Conferences called to consider the matter. At first, he hesitated to engage in war but eventually authorized the Pearl Harbor strike despite dissent from certain advisors. Final authorization was not given by the emperor until December 1, after a majority of Japanese leaders advised him the Hull note would "destroy the fruits of the China incident, endanger Manchukuo and undermine Japanese control of Korea". Before the attack, he became more involved in military matters, even joining the Conference of Military Councillors, which was considered unusual for him. Additionally, he actively sought more information about the war plans. According to an aide, he openly displayed happiness upon hearing about the success of the surprise attacks.

By late 1941, many observers believed that hostilities between the United States and Japan were imminent. A Gallup poll just before the attack on Pearl Harbor found that 52% of Americans expected war with Japan, 27% did not, and 21% had no opinion. While American Pacific bases and facilities had been placed on alert on many occasions, officials doubted Pearl Harbor would be the first target; instead, they expected the Philippines to be attacked first. This presumption was due to the threat that the air bases throughout that country and the naval base at Manila posed to sea lanes, as well as to the shipment of supplies to Japan from territory to the south. (Note: Noted by Arthur MacArthur in the 1890s.) They also incorrectly believed that Japan was not capable of mounting more than one major naval operation at a time.

=== Objectives ===
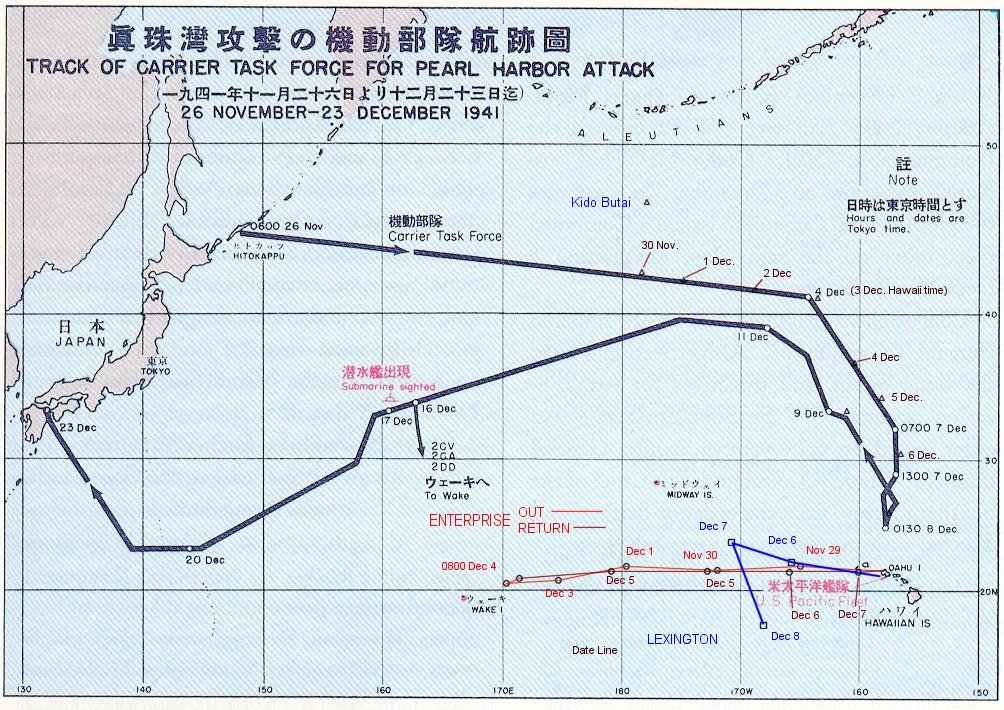
The route followed by the Japanese fleet to Pearl Harbor and back

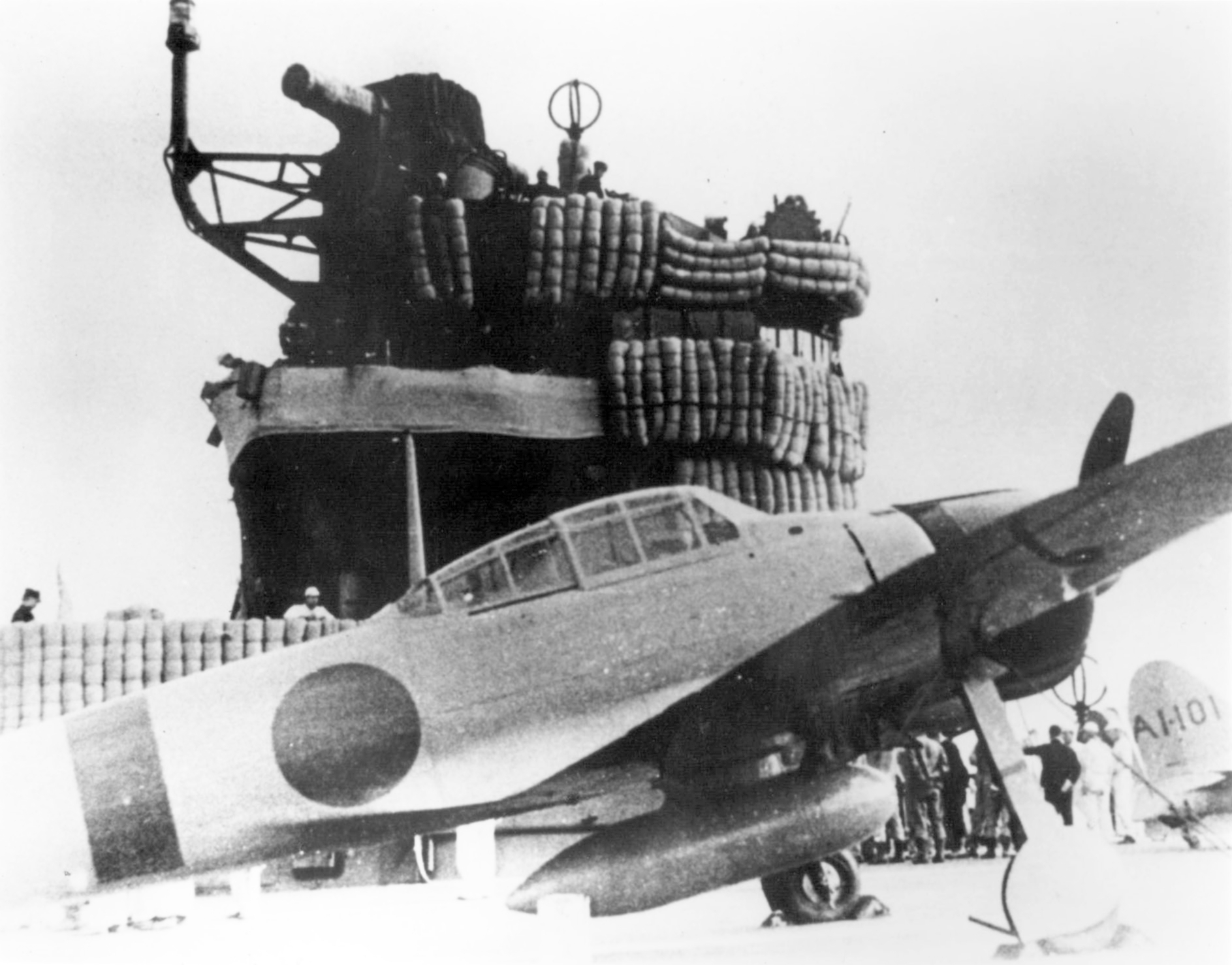
An Imperial Japanese Navy Mitsubishi A6M Zero fighter on the aircraft carrier Akagi

The Japanese attack had several major aims. First, it intended to destroy important American fleet units, thereby preventing the Pacific Fleet from interfering with the Japanese conquest of the Dutch East Indies and Malaya and enabling Japan to conquer Southeast Asia without interference. The leaders of the Imperial Japanese Navy (IJN) subscribed to Alfred Thayer Mahan's "decisive battle" doctrine, especially that of destroying the maximum number of battleships. Second, it was hoped to buy time for Japan to consolidate its position and increase its naval strength before shipbuilding authorized by the 1940 Vinson-Walsh Act erased any chance of victory. Third, to deliver a blow to America's ability to mobilize its forces in the Pacific, battleships were chosen as the main targets, since they were the prestige ships of navies at the time. Finally, it was hoped that the attack would undermine American morale to such an extent that the American government would drop its demands contrary to Japanese interests and seek a peace compromise.

Striking the Pacific Fleet at anchor in Pearl Harbor had two distinct disadvantages: the targeted ships would be in very shallow water, so it would be relatively easy to salvage and possibly repair them, and most of the crews would survive the attack since many would be on shore leave or would be rescued from the harbor. A further disadvantage would prove to be the unexpected absence of all three Pacific Fleet aircraft carriers (Enterprise, Lexington, and Saratoga). Despite these concerns, Yamamoto decided to press ahead.

Japanese confidence in their ability to win a short war meant that other targets in the harbor, especially the navy yard, oil tank farms and submarine base, were left unscathed, since by their thinking the war would be over before the influence of these facilities would be felt.

== Approach and attack ==
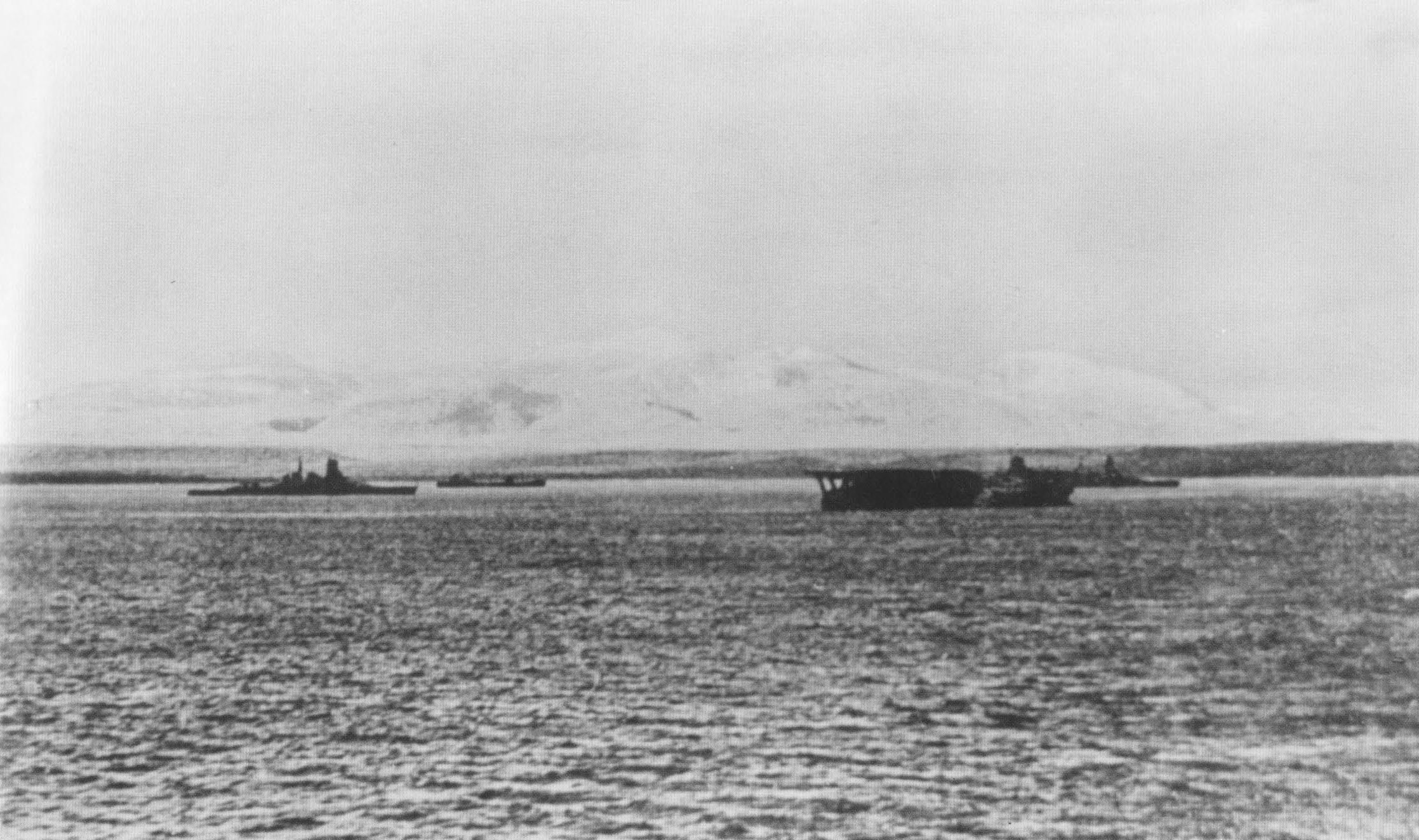
Part of the Japanese task force on November 22, 1941, before its departure

On November 26, 1941, Kido Butai, the Mobile Strike Force of the Japanese Navy, departed Hittokapu Bay on Etorofu (now Iterup) Island in the Kuril Islands: six aircraft carriers (Akagi, Kaga, Sōryū, Hiryū, Shōkaku, and Zuikaku), two battleships, three cruisers, 11 destroyers, and eight oilers.

The Japanese plan was for the fleet to steam to a position northwest of Hawaii, and attack Pearl Harbor with aircraft. The attack would consist of about 360 aircraft in two waves. 48 fighter aircraft would remain as defensive combat air patrol (CAP) over the fleet.

The first wave of 180 aircraft was to be the primary attack. The level bombers in this wave were armed with armor-piercing bombs or specially adapted Type 91 aerial torpedoes equipped with an anti-roll mechanism and a rudder extension to operate in the shallow water of Pearl Harbor. The level bombers were to attack battleships and aircraft carriers, or if these were not present, cruisers and destroyers. The dive bombers were to attack land targets with general purpose (GP) bombs. The fighters were to strafe airfields, destroying aircraft on the ground, and engage any that got into the air, thus preventing any interference with the bombers.

The second wave of 180 aircraft was to be similar, but carry only GP bombs and mainly strike airfields. They would target carriers first, cruisers second, and battleships third.

Returning fighters were to refuel and then join the CAP over the fleet.

Before launching the attack, the Strike Force would launch two reconnaissance floatplanes from heavy cruisers Chikuma and Tone, to scout Oahu and Lahaina Roads near Maui, respectively.

Some historians think these reconnaissance aircraft flights risked alerting the Americans, and were not necessary. Fleet composition and preparedness information in Pearl Harbor were already known from the reports of the Japanese spy Takeo Yoshikawa.

Tone's floatplane and the fleet submarine I-72 reported that the American fleet was not at Lahaina Roads. Another four floatplanes patrolled the area between the Japanese carrier force and Niʻihau, to detect any counterattack.

=== Submarines ===
Fleet submarines I-16, I-18, I-20, I-22, and I-24 each embarked a Type A midget submarine for transport to the waters off Oahu. The five I-boats left Kure Naval District on November 25, 1941. On December 6, they came to within 10 nmi (19 km; 12 mi) of the mouth of Pearl Harbor and launched their midget subs at about 01:00 local time on December 7. At 03:42 Hawaiian time, the minesweeper Condor spotted a midget submarine periscope southwest of the Pearl Harbor entrance buoy and alerted the destroyer Ward. The midget may have entered Pearl Harbor. However, Ward sank another midget submarine at 06:37 (Note: She was located by a University of Hawaiʻi research submersible on August 28, 2002, in 400 m (1,300 ft) of water, 6 nmi (11 km) outside the harbor.) in the first American shots in the Pacific Theater. A midget submarine on the north side of Ford Island missed the seaplane tender Curtiss with her first torpedo and missed the attacking destroyer Monaghan with her other one before being sunk by Monaghan at 08:43.

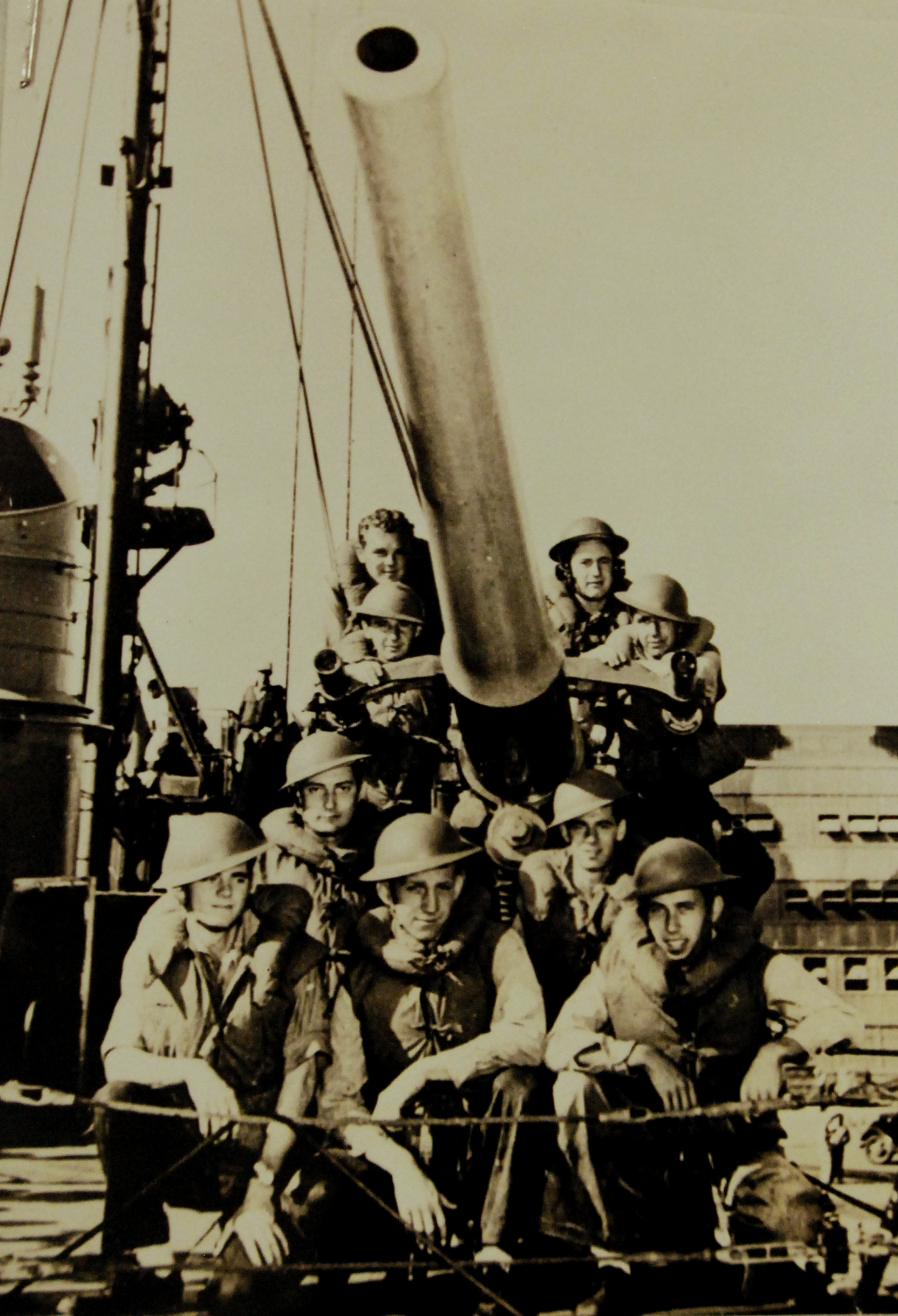
The gun crew of the Ward's number three, 4-inch gun fired the first shots of the Pacific War, sinking a Japanese midget submarine attempting to enter Pearl Harbor.

A third midget submarine, Ha-19, grounded twice, once outside the harbor entrance and again on the east side of Oahu, where it was captured on December 8. Ensign Kazuo Sakamaki swam ashore and was captured by Hawaii National Guard Corporal David Akui, becoming the first Japanese prisoner of war. (Note: While the nine sailors who died in the attack were quickly lionized by the Japanese government as Kyūgunshin ("The Nine War Heroes"), the news of Sakamaki's capture, which had been publicized in American news broadcasts, was kept secret. Even after the war, however, he received recriminating correspondence from those who despised him for not sacrificing his own life.) A fourth had been damaged by a depth charge attack and was abandoned by its crew before it could fire its torpedoes. It was found outside the harbor in 1960. Japanese forces received a radio message from a midget submarine at 00:41 on December 8 claiming to have damaged one or more large warships inside Pearl Harbor.

In 1992, 2000, and 2001, Hawaii Undersea Research Laboratory's submersibles found the wreck of the fifth midget submarine lying in three parts outside Pearl Harbor. The wreck was in the debris field where much surplus American equipment had been dumped after the war, including vehicles and landing craft. Both of its torpedoes were missing. This correlates with reports of two torpedoes fired at the light cruiser St. Louis at 10:04 at the entrance of Pearl Harbor, and a possible torpedo fired at destroyer Helm at 08:21. There is dispute over this official chain of events though. The "torpedo" that St. Louis saw was also reportedly a porpoising minesweeping float being towed by the destroyer Boggs. Some historians and naval architects theorize that a photo of Battleship Row, taken by a Japanese naval aviator during the attack on Pearl Harbor, which was declassified in the 1990s and publicized in the 2000s, shows the fifth midget submarine firing a torpedo at West Virginia and another at Oklahoma. These torpedoes were twice the size of the aerial torpedoes so it was possible that both torpedoes heavily contributed to the sinkings of both ships and especially helped to capsize Oklahoma as Oklahoma was the only battleship that day to suffer catastrophic damage to her belt armor at the waterline from a torpedo. Admiral Chester Nimitz, in a report to Congress, confirmed that one midget submarine's torpedo (possibly from the other midget submarine that fired torpedoes but failed to hit a target) which was fired but did not explode was recovered in Pearl Harbor and was much larger than the aerial torpedoes. Others dispute this report.

=== Japanese declaration of war ===
The attack took place before any formal declaration of war was made by Japan, but this was not Admiral Yamamoto's intention. He originally stipulated that the attack should not commence until thirty minutes after Japan had informed the United States that peace negotiations were at an end. However, the attack began before the notice could be delivered. Tokyo transmitted the 5000-word notification (commonly called the "14-Part Message") in two blocks to the Japanese Embassy in Washington. Transcribing the message took too long for the Japanese ambassador to deliver it at 1:00 p.m. Washington time, as ordered, and consequently the message was not presented until more than one hour after the attack had begun — but American code breakers had already deciphered and translated most of the message hours before it was scheduled to be delivered. The final part of the message is sometimes described as a declaration of war. While it was viewed by a number of senior American government and military officials as a very strong indicator negotiations were likely to be terminated and that war might break out at any moment, it neither declared war nor severed diplomatic relations. A declaration of war was printed on the front page of Japan's newspapers in the evening edition of December 8 (late December 7 in the United States), but not delivered to the American government until the day after the attack.

For decades, conventional wisdom held that Japan attacked without first formally breaking diplomatic relations only because of accidents and bumbling that delayed the delivery of a document hinting at war to Washington. In 1999, however, Takeo Iguchi, a professor of law and international relations at International Christian University in Tokyo, discovered documents that pointed to a vigorous debate inside the government over how, and indeed whether, to notify Washington of Japan's intention to break off negotiations and start a war, including a December 7 entry in the war diary saying, "[O]ur deceptive diplomacy is steadily proceeding toward success." Of this, Iguchi said, "The diary shows that the army and navy did not want to give any proper declaration of war, or indeed prior notice even of the termination of negotiations ... and they clearly prevailed."

In any event, even if the Japanese had decoded and delivered the 14-Part Message before the beginning of the attack, it would not have constituted either a formal break of diplomatic relations or a declaration of war. The final two paragraphs of the message read:

Thus the earnest hope of the Japanese Government to adjust Japanese-American relations and to preserve and promote the peace of the Pacific through cooperation with the American Government has finally been lost.

The Japanese Government regrets to have to notify hereby the American Government that in view of the attitude of the American Government it cannot but consider that it is impossible to reach an agreement through further negotiations.

United States naval intelligence officers were alarmed by the unusual timing for delivering the message — 1:00 p.m. on a Sunday, which was 7:30 a.m. in Hawaii — and attempted to alert Pearl Harbor. But due to communication problems the warning was not delivered before the attack.

=== First wave composition ===
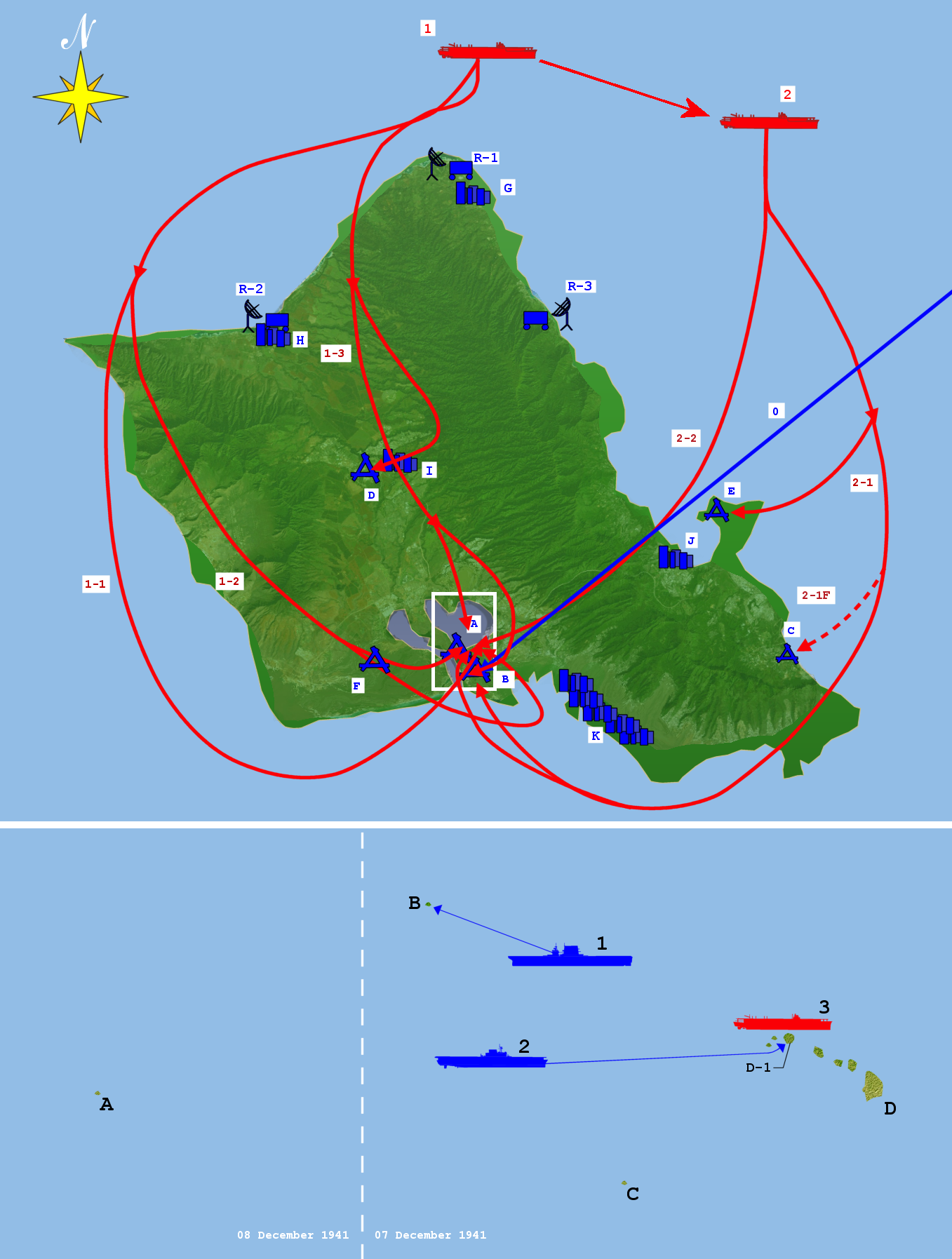
The Japanese attacked in two waves. The first wave was detected by United States Army radar at 136 nautical miles (252 km), but was misidentified as United States Army Air Forces bombers arriving from the American mainland. Top: A: Ford Island NAS. B: Hickam Field. C: Bellows Field. D: Wheeler Field. E: Kaneohe NAS. F: Ewa MCAS. R-1: Opana Radar Station. R-2: Kawailoa RS. R-3: Kaaawa RS. G: Kahuku. H: Haleiwa. I: Wahiawa. J: Kaneohe. K: Honolulu. 0: B-17s from mainland. 1: First strike group. 1-1: Level bombers. 1–2: Torpedo bombers. 1–3: Dive bombers. 2: Second strike group. 2-1: Level bombers. 2-1F: Fighters. 2-2: Dive bombers. Bottom: A: Wake Island. B: Midway Islands. C: Johnston Island. D: Hawaii. D-1: Oahu. 1: Lexington. 2: Enterprise. 3: First Air Fleet.

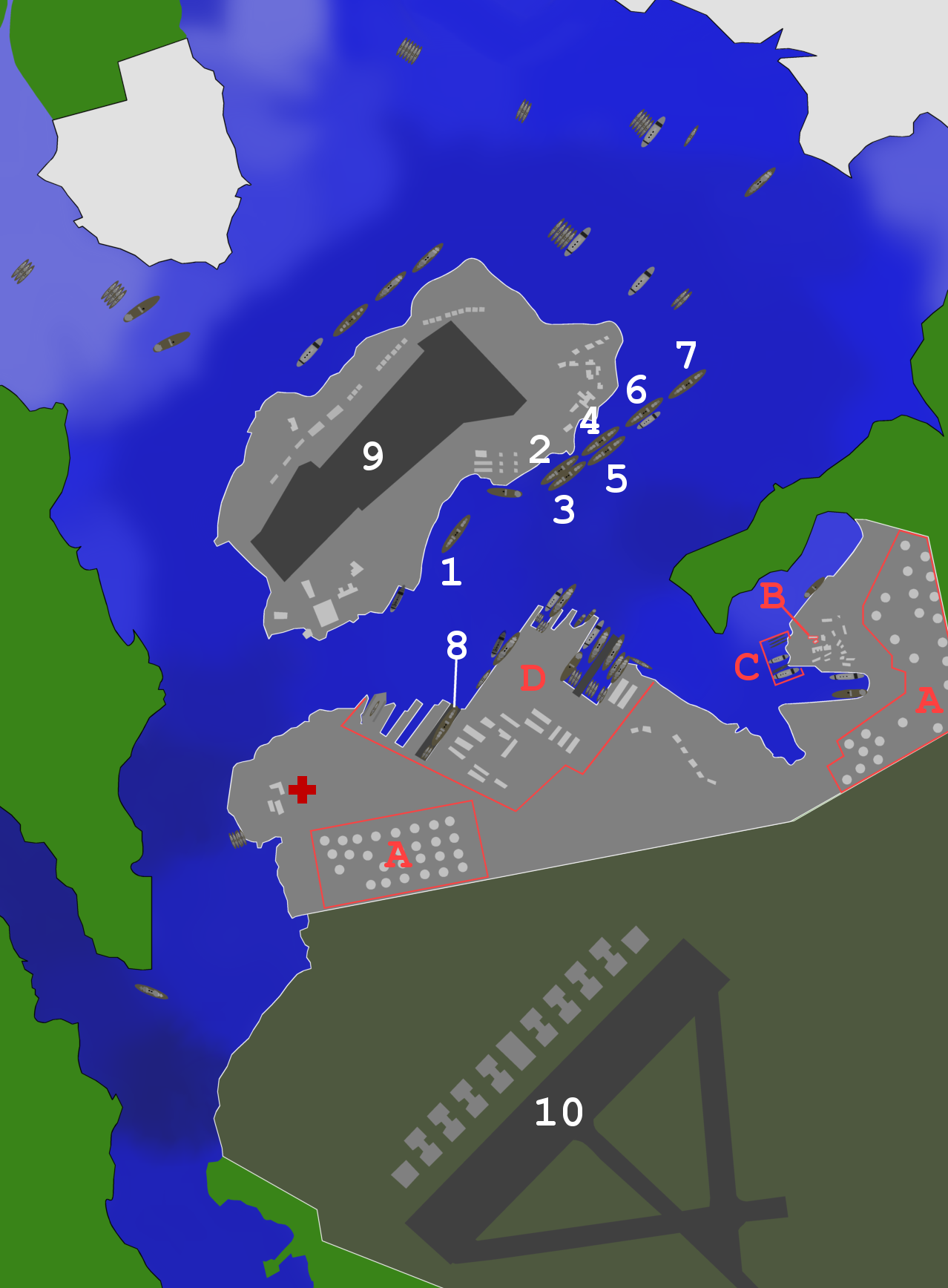
City Army base Navy base Attacked targets: 1: USS California. 2: USS Maryland. 3: USS Oklahoma. 4: USS Tennessee. 5: USS West Virginia. 6: USS Arizona. 7: USS Nevada. 8: USS Pennsylvania. 9: Ford Island NAS. 10: Hickam field. Ignored infrastructure targets: A: Oil storage tanks. B: CINCPAC headquarters building. C: Submarine base. D: Navy Yard.

The first attack wave of 183 airplanes, led by Commander Mitsuo Fuchida, was launched north of Oahu. Six airplanes failed to launch due to technical difficulties. The first wave included three groups of airplanes: (Note: The Japanese Attack on Pearl Harbor, Planning and Execution. First wave: 189 planes, 50 Kates w/bombs, 40 Kates with torpedoes, 54 Vals, 45 Zekes Second wave: 171 planes, 54 Kates w/bombs, 81 Vals, 36 Zekes. The Combat Air Patrol over the carriers alternated 18 plane shifts every two hours, with 18 more ready for takeoff on the flight decks and an additional 18 ready on hangar decks.)

- 1st Group (targets: battleships and aircraft carriers)
  - 49 Nakajima B5N Kate bombers armed with 800‑kg (1760 lb) armor-piercing bombs, organized in four sections (one failed to launch)
  - 40 B5N bombers armed with Type 91 torpedoes, also in four sections
- 2nd Group – (targets: Ford Island and Wheeler Field)
  - 51 Aichi D3A Val dive bombers armed with 550 lb (249 kg) general-purpose bombs (3 failed to launch)
- 3rd Group – (targets: aircraft at Ford Island, Hickam Field, Wheeler Field, Barber's Point, Kaneohe)
  - 43 Mitsubishi A6M "Zero" fighters for air control and strafing (2 failed to launch)

As the first wave approached Oahu, it was detected by United States Army SCR-270 radar positioned at Opana Point near the island's northern tip. This post had been in training mode for months, but was not yet operational. The operators, Privates George Elliot Jr. and Joseph Lockard, reported a target to Private Joseph P. McDonald, who was stationed at Fort Shafter's Intercept Center near Pearl Harbor Lieutenant Kermit A. Tyler, a newly assigned officer at the thinly manned Intercept Center, presumed it was the scheduled arrival of six B-17 bombers from California. The Japanese planes were approaching from a direction very close (only a few degrees difference) to that of the bombers, and while the operators had never seen a formation as large on radar, they neglected to tell Tyler of its size. Tyler, for security reasons, could not tell the operators of the six B-17s that were due (even though it was widely known).

As the first wave approached Oahu, they encountered and shot down several small American civilian aircraft. At least one of these radioed a somewhat incoherent warning. Other warnings from ships off the harbor entrance were still being processed or awaiting confirmation when the Japanese air assault began at 7:48 a.m. Hawaiian time (3:18 a.m. December 8 Japanese Standard Time, as kept by ships of the Kido Butai), with the attack on Kaneohe. A total of 353 Japanese planes reached Oahu in two waves. Slow, vulnerable torpedo bombers led the first wave, exploiting the first moments of surprise to attack the most important ships present (the battleships), while dive bombers attacked American air bases across Oahu, starting with Hickam Field, the largest, and Wheeler Field, the main United States Army Air Forces fighter base. The 171 planes in the second wave attacked the Army Air Forces' Bellows Field, near Kaneohe on the windward side of the island, and Ford Island. The only aerial opposition came from a handful of P-36 Hawks, P-40 Warhawks and some SBD Dauntless dive bombers from the carrier Enterprise. (Note: In the twenty-five sorties flown, USAF Historical Study No.85 credits six pilots with ten planes destroyed: 1st Lieutenant Lewis M. Sanders (P-36) and 2nd Lieutenants Philip M Rasmussen (P-36), Gordon H. Sterling Jr. (P-36, killed in action), Harry W. Brown (P-36), Kenneth M. Taylor (P-40, 2), and George S. Welch (P-40, 4). Three of the P-36 kills were not verified by the Japanese and may have been shot down by naval anti-aircraft fire.)

In the first-wave attack, about eight of the forty-nine 800‑kg (1760 lb) armor-piercing bombs dropped hit their intended battleship targets. At least two of those bombs broke up on impact, another detonated before penetrating an unarmored deck, and one was a dud. Thirteen of the forty torpedoes hit battleships, while four hit other ships. Men aboard the ships awoke to the sounds of alarms, bombs exploding, and gunfire, prompting them to dress as they ran to General Quarters stations. (The famous message "Air raid Pearl Harbor. This is not drill." (Note: Odd though it may sound, "not" is correct, in keeping with standard Navy telegraphic practice. This was confirmed by Beloite and Beloite after years of research and debate.) was sent from the headquarters of Patrol Wing Two, the first senior Hawaiian command to respond.) American servicemen were caught unprepared by the attack. Ammunition lockers were locked, aircraft parked wingtip to wingtip in the open to prevent sabotage, guns unmanned (none of the Navy's 5"/38s, only a quarter of its machine guns, and only four of 31 Army batteries got in action). Despite this low alert status, many American military personnel responded effectively during the attack. (Note: The gunners that did get in action scored most of the victories against Japanese aircraft that morning, including the first of the attack by Tautog, and Dorie Miller's Navy Cross-worthy effort. Miller was an African-American cook aboard West Virginia who took over an unattended anti-aircraft gun on which he had no training. He was the first African-American sailor to be awarded the Navy Cross.) Ensign Joseph Taussig Jr., aboard Nevada, commanded the ship's antiaircraft guns and was severely wounded but remained at his post. Lieutenant Commander F. J. Thomas commanded Nevada in the captain's absence and got her underway until the ship was grounded at 9:10 a.m. One of the destroyers, Aylwin, got underway with only four officers aboard, all ensigns, none with more than a year's sea duty; she operated at sea for 36 hours before her commanding officer managed to get back aboard. Captain Mervyn Bennion, commanding West Virginia, led his men until he was cut down by fragments from a bomb which hit Tennessee, moored alongside.

=== Second wave composition ===
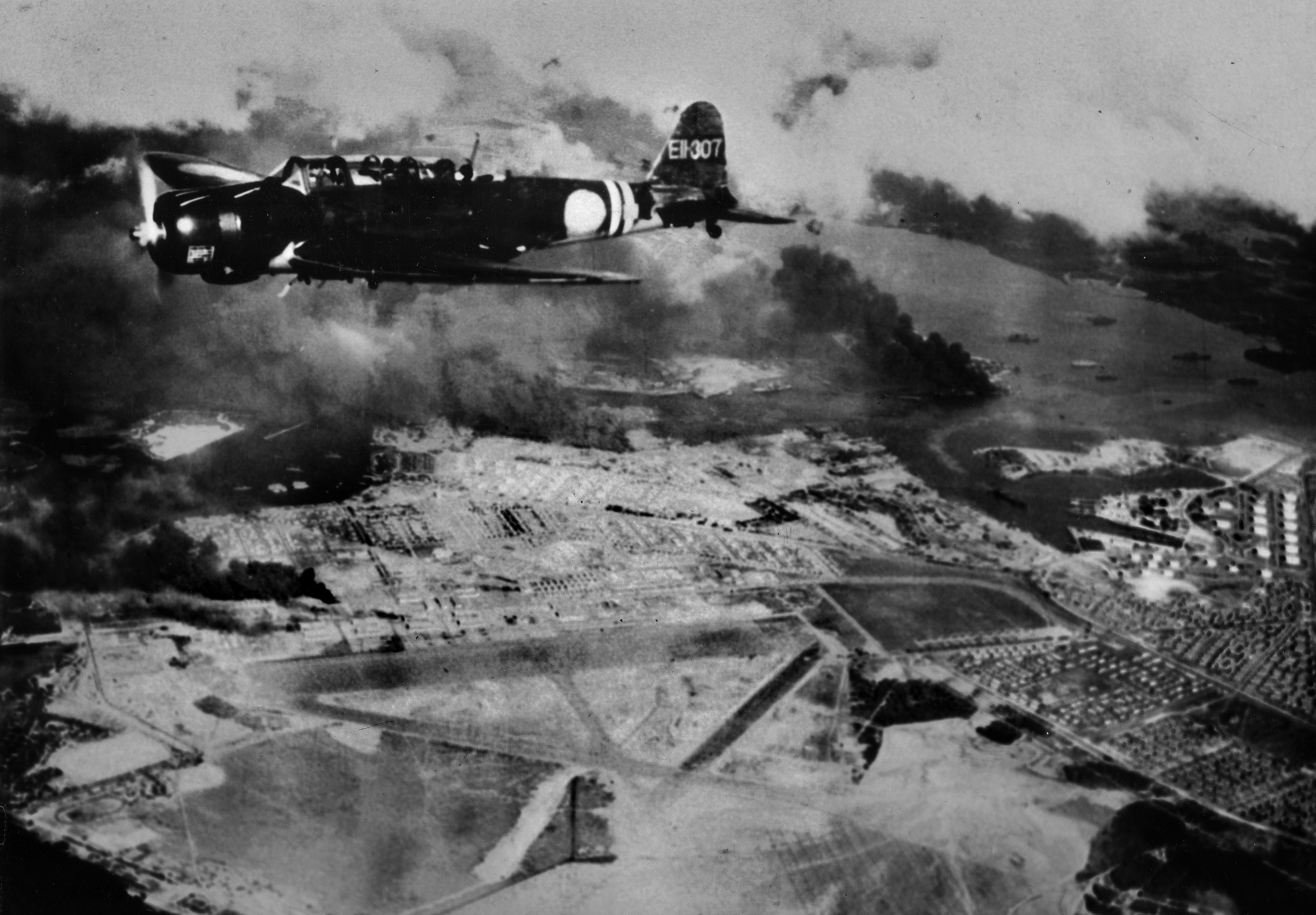
Second wave B5N2 Bomber Kate Over Hickam Field

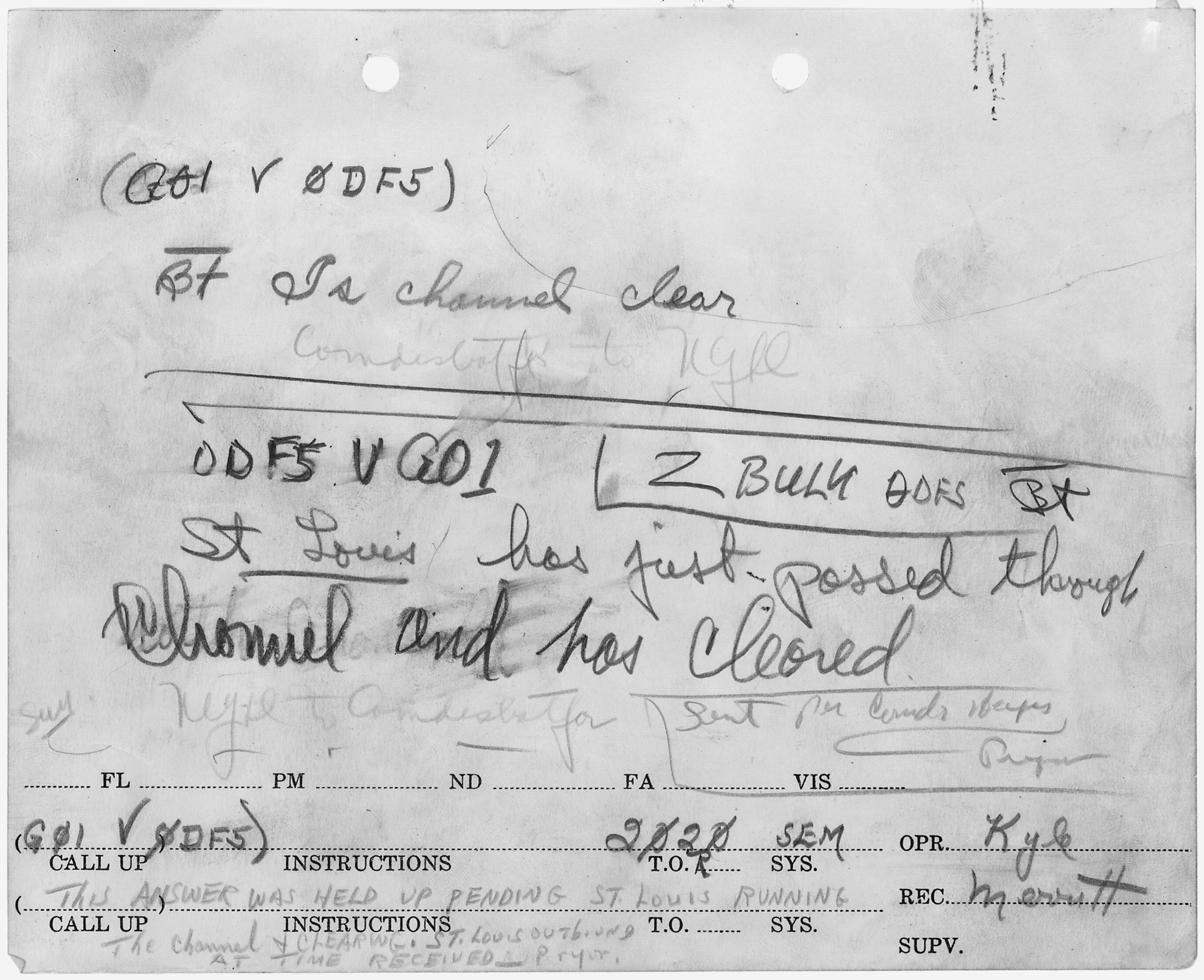
This message, in response to the question "Is channel clear?" denotes the first US ship, relates to orders for St. Louis to clear Pearl Harbor. It is now housed with the National Archives and Records Administration.

The second planned wave consisted of 171 planes: 54 B5Ns, 81 D3As, and 36 A6Ms, commanded by Lieutenant-Commander Shigekazu Shimazaki. Four planes failed to launch because of technical difficulties. This wave and its targets also comprised three groups of planes:

- 1st Group – 54 B5Ns armed with 550 lb (249 kg) and 132 lb (60 kg) general-purpose bombs
  - 27 B5Ns – aircraft and hangars on Kaneohe, Ford Island, and Barbers Point
  - 27 B5Ns – hangars and aircraft on Hickam Field
- 2nd Group (targets: aircraft carriers and cruisers)
  - 78 D3As armed with 550 lb (249 kg) general-purpose bombs, in four sections (3 aborted)
- 3rd Group – (targets: aircraft at Ford Island, Hickam Field, Wheeler Field, Barber's Point, Kaneohe)
  - 35 A6Ms for defense and strafing (1 aborted)

The second wave was divided into three groups. One was tasked to attack Kāneʻohe, the rest Pearl Harbor proper. The separate sections arrived at the attack point almost simultaneously from several directions.

=== American casualties and damage ===
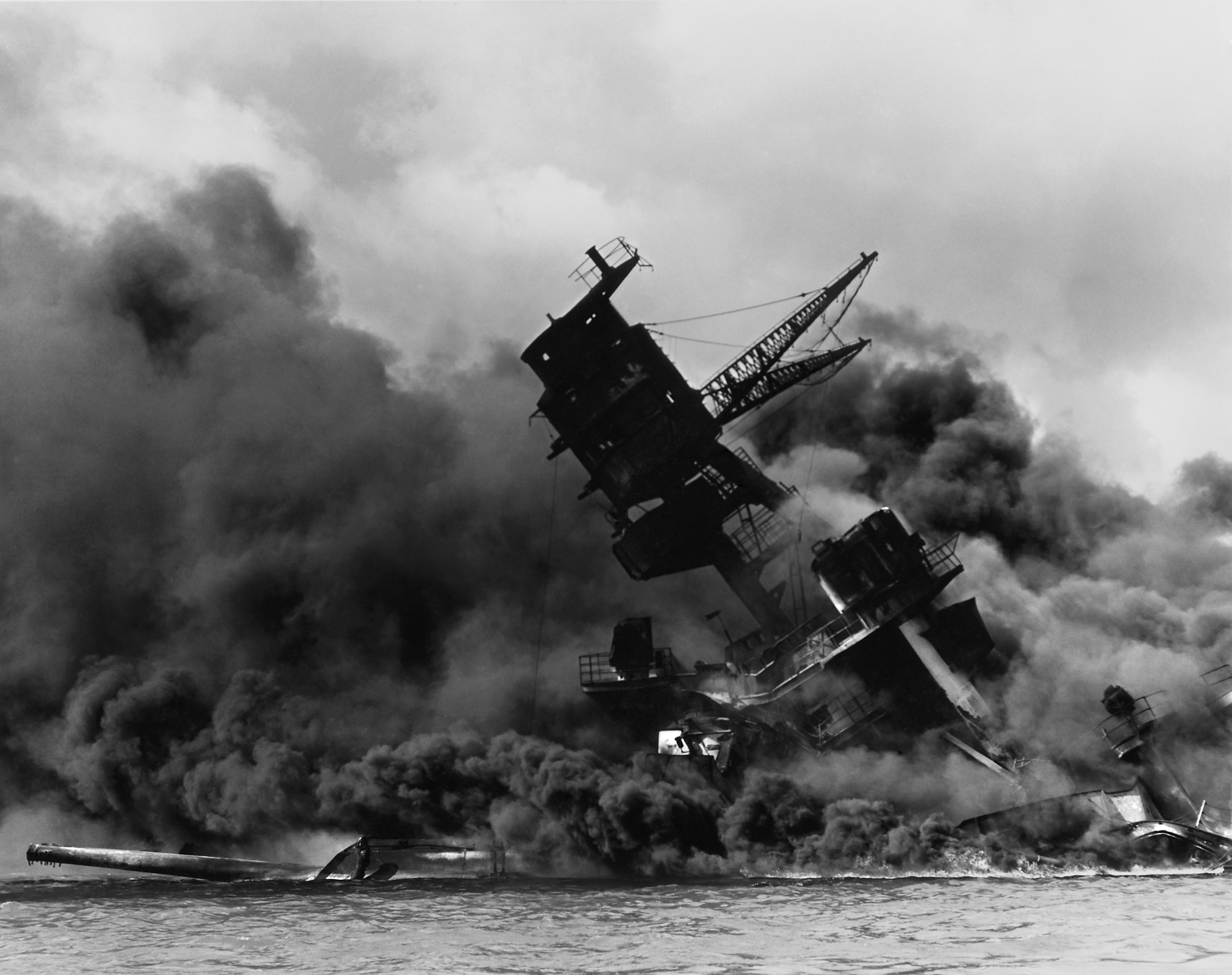
Arizona during the attack

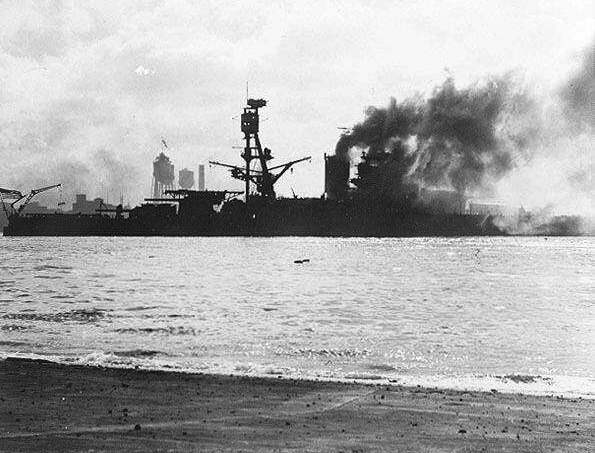
Nevada, on fire and down at the bow, attempting to leave the harbor before being deliberately beached

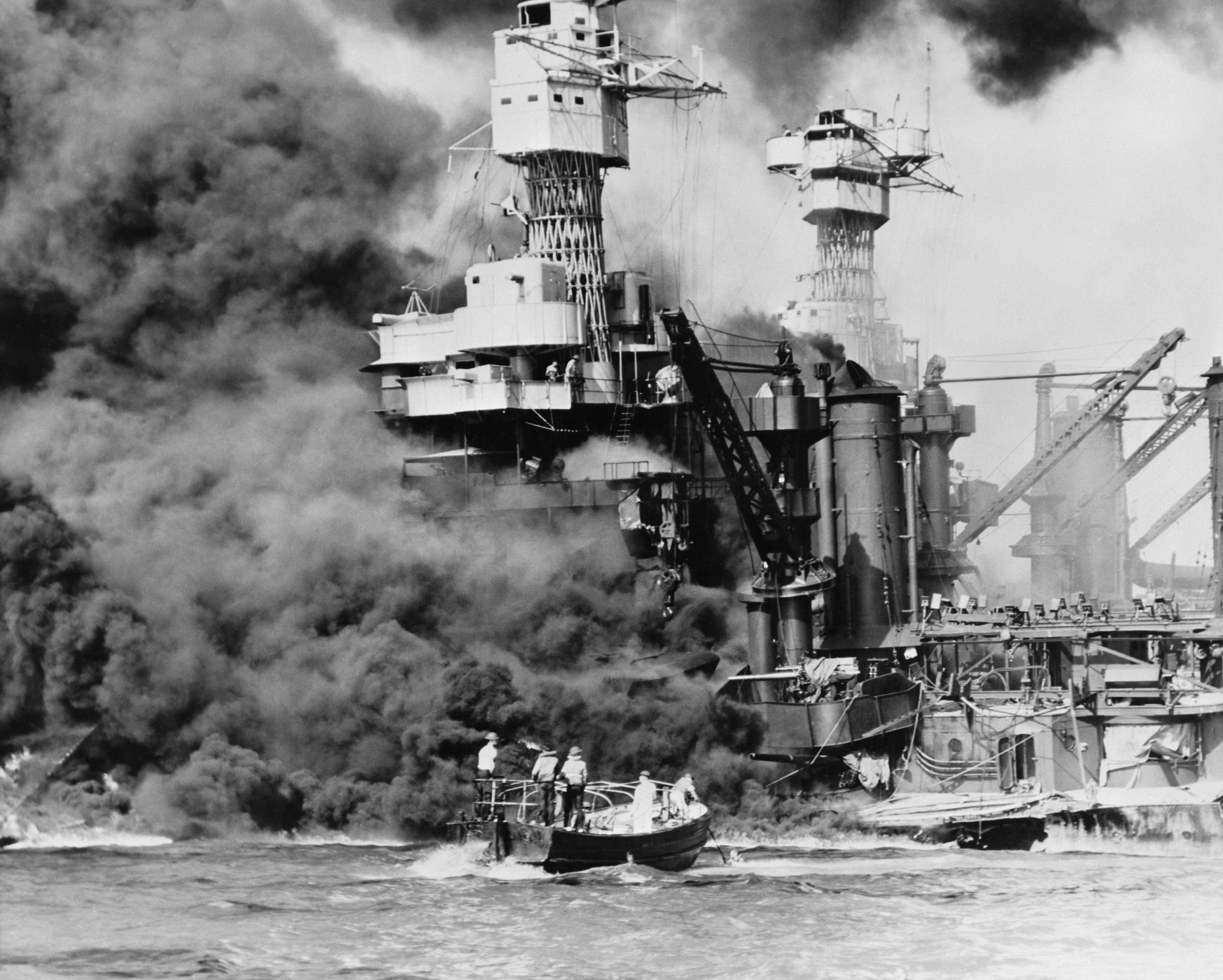
West Virginia was sunk by six torpedoes and two bombs during the attack.

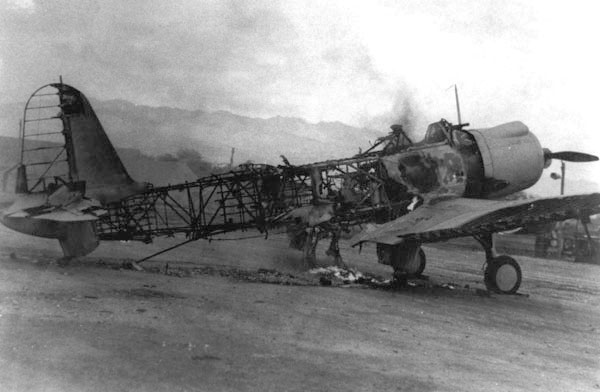
A destroyed Vindicator at Ewa field, the victim of one of the smaller attacks on the approach to Pearl Harbor

Ninety minutes after it began, the attack was over. 2,008 sailors were killed and 710 others wounded; 218 soldiers and airmen (who were part of the Army before the independent United States Air Force in 1947) were killed and 364 wounded; 109 Marines were killed and 69 wounded; and 68 civilians were killed and 35 wounded. In total, 2,403 Americans were killed, and 1,178 were wounded. Eighteen ships were sunk or run aground, including five battleships. All of the Americans killed or wounded during the attack were legally non-combatants, given that there was no state of war when the attack occurred.

Of the American fatalities, nearly half were due to the explosion of Arizona's forward magazine after she was hit by a modified 16-inch (410 mm) shell. (Note: The wreck has become a memorial to those lost that day, most of whom remain within the ship. She continues to leak small amounts of fuel oil, decades after the attack.) Author Craig Nelson wrote that the vast majority of the US sailors killed at Pearl Harbor were junior enlisted personnel. "The officers of the Navy all lived in houses and the junior people were the ones on the boats, so pretty much all of the people who died in the direct line of the attack were very junior people", Nelson said. "So everyone is about 17 or 18 whose story is told there."

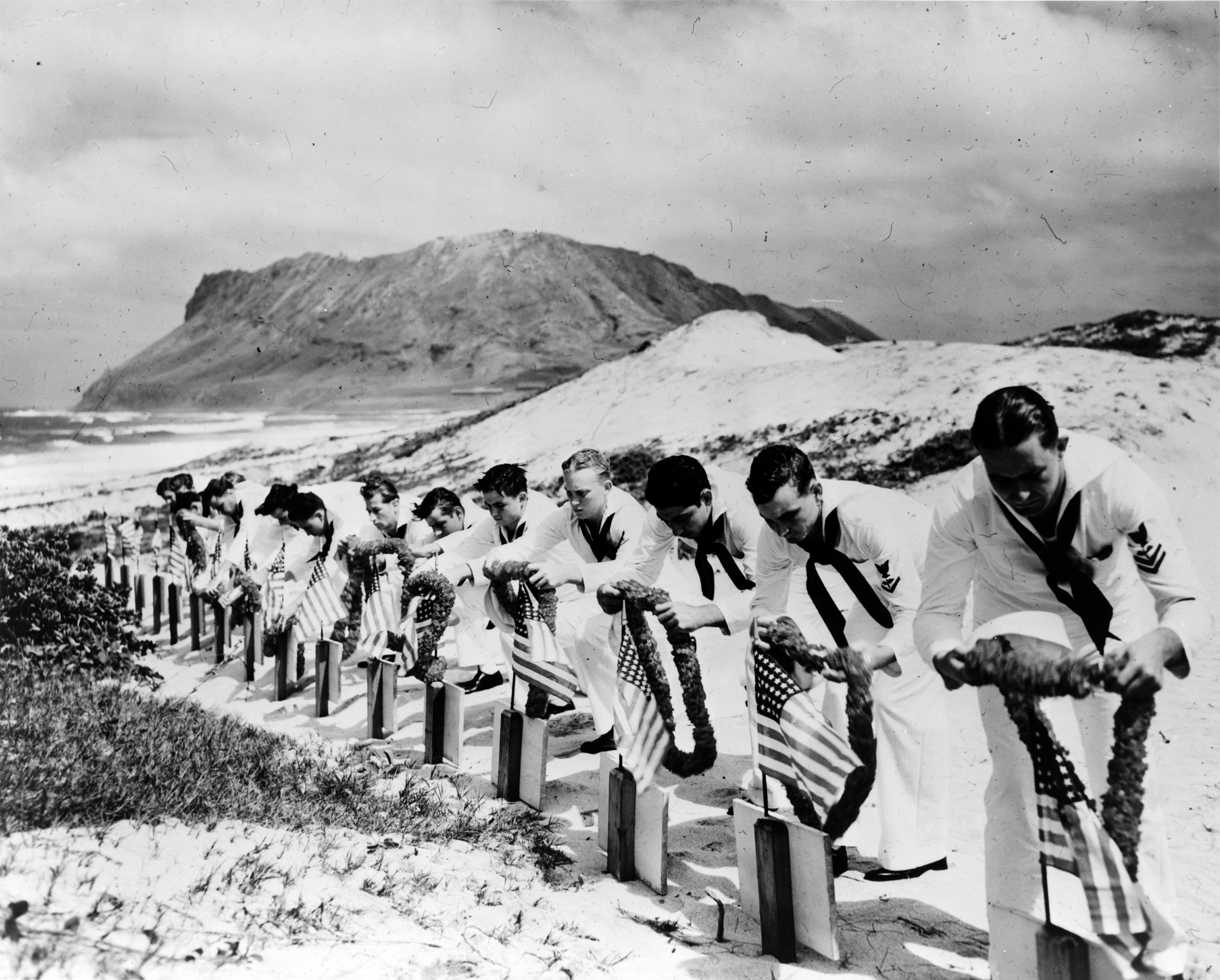
Memorial service at NAS Kaneohe for men killed during the attack on Pearl Harbor

Among the notable civilian casualties were nine Honolulu Fire Department firefighters who responded to Hickam Field during the bombing in Honolulu, becoming the only fire department members on American soil to be attacked by a foreign power in history. Fireman Harry Tuck Lee Pang of Engine 6 was killed near the hangars by machine-gun fire from a Japanese plane. Captains Thomas Macy and John Carreira of Engine 4 and Engine 1, respectively, died while battling flames inside the hangar after a Japanese bomb crashed through the roof. An additional six firefighters were wounded by Japanese shrapnel. The wounded later received Purple Hearts (originally reserved for service members wounded by enemy action while partaking in armed conflicts) for their peacetime actions that day on June 13, 1944; the three firefighters killed did not receive theirs until December 7, 1984, on the 43rd anniversary of the attack. This made the nine men the only non-military firefighters to receive such an award in American history.

Already damaged by a torpedo and on fire amidships, Nevada attempted to exit the harbor. She was targeted by many Japanese bombers as she got underway and sustained more hits from 250 lb (113 kg) bombs, which started further fires. She was deliberately beached to avoid risking blocking the harbor entrance if she sank there. California was hit by two bombs and two torpedoes. The crew might have kept her afloat, but were ordered to abandon ship just as they were raising power for the pumps. Burning oil from Arizona and West Virginia was drifted down toward her and probably made the situation look worse than it was. The disarmed target ship Utah was holed twice by torpedoes. West Virginia was hit by seven torpedoes, the seventh tearing away her rudder. Oklahoma was hit by four torpedoes, the last two above her belt armor, which caused her to capsize. Maryland was hit by two of the converted 16" shells, but neither caused serious damage.

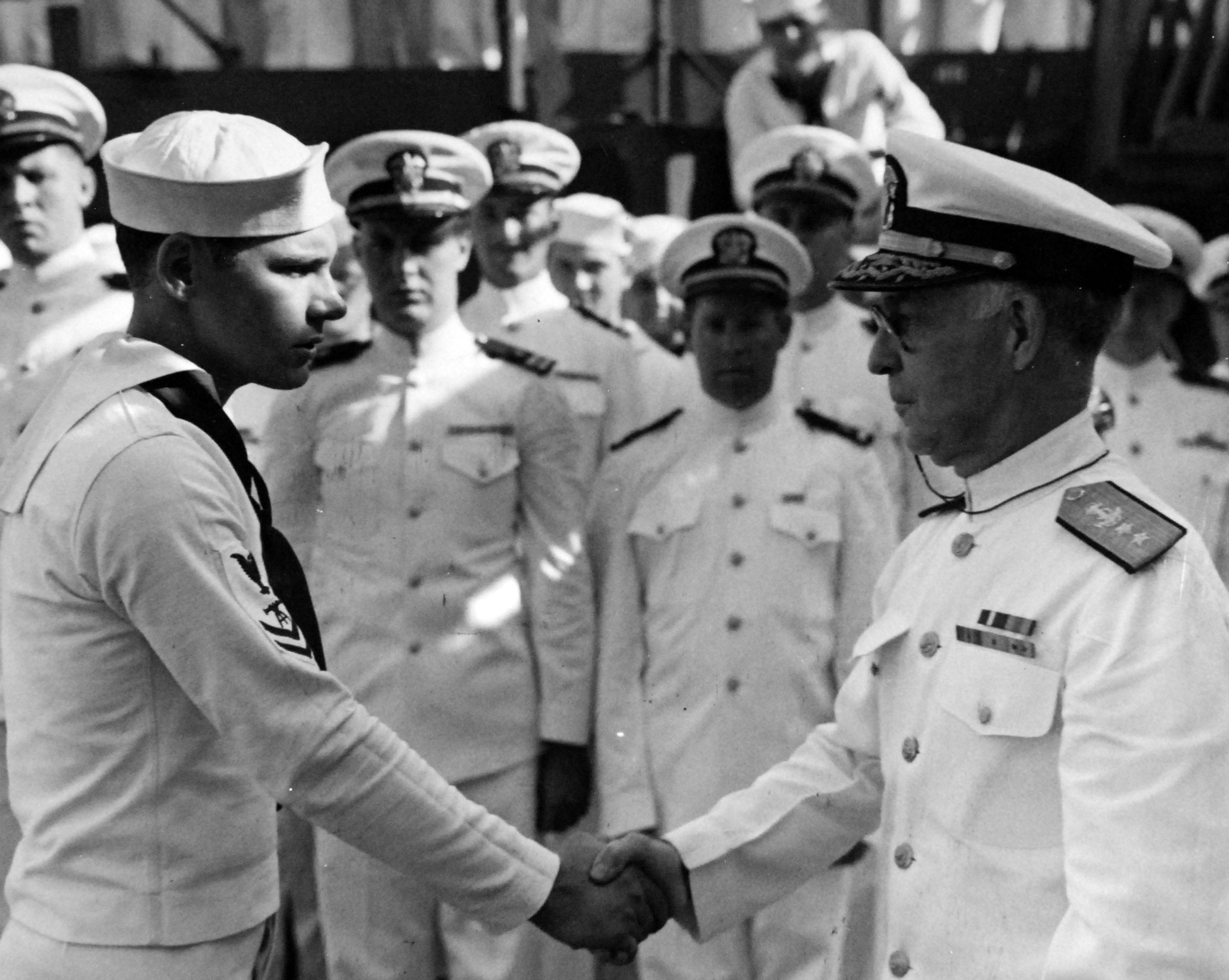
Rear Admiral Ernest G. Small (right) presents Purple Heart medals to enlisted men wounded in the Pearl Harbor attack

Although the Japanese concentrated on battleships (the largest vessels present), they did not ignore other targets. The light cruiser Helena was torpedoed, and the concussion from the blast capsized the neighboring minelayer Oglala. Two destroyers in dry dock, Cassin and Downes, were destroyed when bombs penetrated their fuel bunkers. The leaking fuel caught fire; flooding the dry dock in an effort to fight fire made the burning oil rise, and both were burned out. Cassin slipped from her keel blocks and rolled against Downes. The light cruiser Raleigh was holed by a torpedo. The light cruiser Honolulu was damaged but remained in service. The repair vessel Vestal, moored alongside Arizona, was heavily damaged and beached. The seaplane tender Curtiss was also damaged. The destroyer Shaw was badly damaged when two bombs penetrated her forward magazine.

Of the 402 American aircraft in Hawaii, 188 were destroyed and 159 damaged, 155 of them on the ground. Almost none were actually ready to take off to defend the base. Eight Army Air Forces pilots managed to get airborne during the attack, and six were credited with downing at least one Japanese aircraft during the attack: 1st Lieutenant Lewis M. Sanders and 2nd Lieutenants Philip M. Rasmussen, Kenneth M. Taylor, George S. Welch, Harry W. Brown, and Gordon H. Sterling Jr. Of 33 Consolidated PBY Catalinas in Hawaii, 30 were destroyed, while three on patrol at the time of the attack returned undamaged. Friendly fire brought down some American planes on top of that, including four from an inbound flight from Enterprise.

At the time of the attack, nine civilian aircraft were flying in the vicinity of Pearl Harbor. Of these, three were shot down.

=== Japanese losses ===
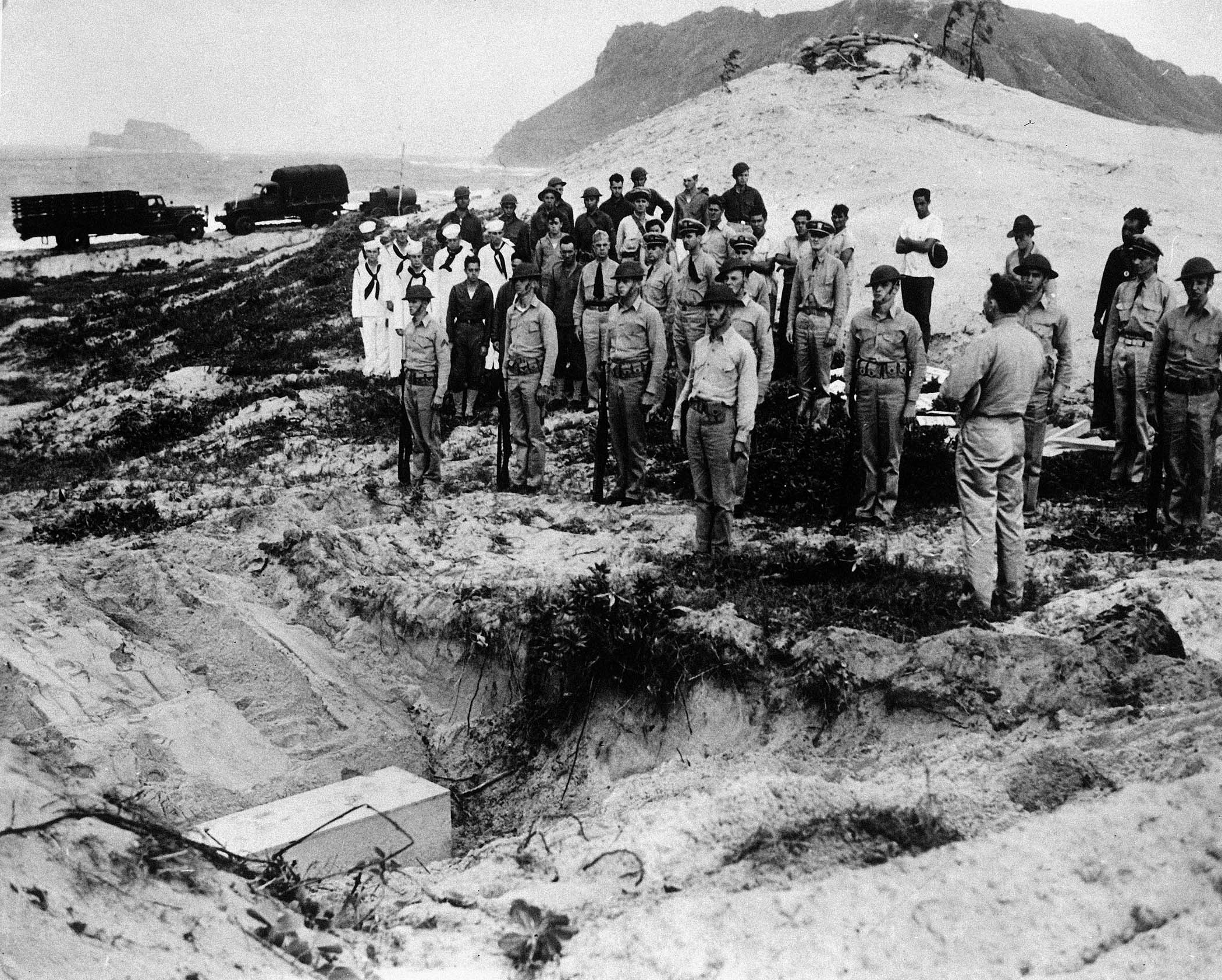
The body of Japanese fighter pilot Fusata Iida was buried with military honors by US troops on December 8, 1941.

Fifty-five Japanese airmen and nine submariners were killed in the attack, and one, Kazuo Sakamaki, was captured. Of Japan's 414 available planes, 350 took part in the raid. Twenty-nine were lost, nine in the first wave (three fighters, one dive bomber, and five torpedo bombers) and twenty in the second (six fighters and fourteen dive bombers), (Note: USAAF pilots of the 46th and 47th Pursuit Squadrons, 15th Pursuit Group, claim to have destroyed ten. Overall, the Americans claimed to have shot down 41 Japanese aircraft.) with another 74 damaged by anti-aircraft fire from the ground.

=== Possible third wave ===
According to some accounts, several Japanese junior officers, including Fuchida and Genda, urged Nagumo to carry out a third strike in order to sink more of Pearl Harbor's remaining warships, and damage the base's maintenance shops, drydock facilities and oil tank yards. Most notably, Fuchida gave a firsthand account of this meeting several times after the war. However, some historians have cast doubt on this and many other of Fuchida's later claims, which sometimes conflict with documented historic records. Genda, who opined during the planning for the attack that without an invasion three strikes were necessary to fully destroy the Pacific Fleet, denied requesting an additional attack. Regardless, it is undisputed that the captains of the other five carriers in the task force reported they were willing and ready to carry out a third strike soon after the second returned, but Nagumo decided to withdraw for several reasons:

- American anti-aircraft performance had improved considerably during the second strike, and two-thirds of Japan's losses were incurred during the second wave.
- Nagumo felt if he launched a third strike, he would be risking three-quarters of the Combined Fleet's strength to wipe out the remaining targets (which included the facilities) while suffering higher aircraft losses.
- The location of the three American carriers remained unknown. In addition, the admiral was concerned his force was now within range of American land-based bombers. Nagumo was uncertain whether the United States had enough surviving planes remaining on Hawaii to launch an attack against his carriers.
- A third wave would have required substantial preparation and turnaround time, and would have meant returning planes would have had to land at night. At the time, only the Royal Navy had developed night carrier techniques, so this was a substantial risk. The first two waves had launched the entirety of the Combined Fleet's air strength. A third wave would have required landing both the first and second wave before launching the first wave again. Compare Nagumo's situation in the Battle of Midway, where an attack returning from Midway kept Nagumo from launching an immediate strike on American carriers.
- The task force's fuel situation did not permit him to remain in waters north of Pearl Harbor much longer, since he was at the very limit of logistical support. To do so risked running unacceptably low on fuel, perhaps even having to abandon destroyers en route home.
- He believed the second strike had essentially accomplished the mission's main objective (neutralizing the United States Pacific Fleet) and did not wish to risk further losses. Moreover, it was IJN practice to prefer the conservation of strength over the total destruction of the enemy.

Although a hypothetical third strike would have likely focused on the base's remaining warships, (Note: Fuchida would later claim he had designated Pearl Harbor's oil storage facilities as the primary target, although this contradicted Japanese military doctrine and even several interviews on the subject he had given earlier in life.) military historians have suggested any potential damage to the shore facilities would have hampered the Pacific Fleet far more seriously. If they had been wiped out, "serious [American] operations in the Pacific would have been postponed for more than a year"; according to Admiral Chester W. Nimitz, later Commander in Chief of the Pacific Fleet, "it would have prolonged the war another two years".

At a conference aboard his flagship the following morning, Yamamoto supported Nagumo's withdrawal without launching a third wave. In retrospect, sparing the vital dockyards, maintenance shops, and the oil tank farm meant the United States could respond relatively quickly in the Pacific. Yamamoto later regretted Nagumo's decision to withdraw and categorically stated it had been a great mistake not to order a third strike.

== Ships lost or damaged ==
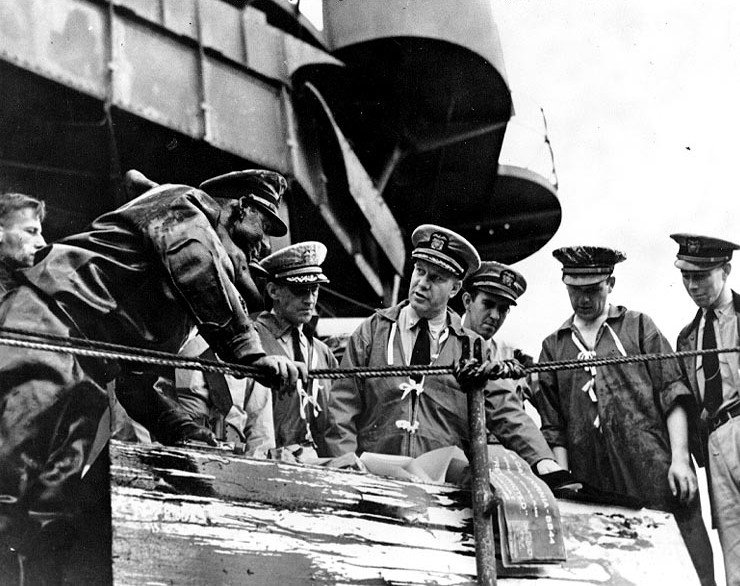
Captain Homer N. Wallin (center) supervises salvage operations aboard USS California in early 1942.

Twenty-one American ships were damaged or lost in the attack, of which all but three were repaired and returned to service. Five of these battleships would, after major repair, participate in the last-ever battleship-on-battleship engagement at the Battle of Surigao Strait, which would result in several Japanese losses, including two battleships.

=== Battleships ===
- Arizona (Rear Admiral Isaac C. Kidd's flagship of Battleship Division One): hit by four armor-piercing bombs, exploded; total loss, not salvaged. 1,177 dead. Later memorialized.
- Oklahoma: hit by five torpedoes, capsized; total loss, salvaged, sank en route to scrapping May 1947. 429 dead.
- West Virginia: hit by two bombs, seven torpedoes, sunk; returned to service July 1944. 106 dead.
- California: hit by two bombs, two torpedoes, sunk; returned to service January 1944. 104 dead.
- Nevada: hit by six bombs, one torpedo, beached; returned to service October 1942. 60 dead.
- Pennsylvania (Admiral Husband E. Kimmel's flagship of the United States Pacific Fleet): in dry dock with Cassin and Downes, hit by one bomb and debris from USS Cassin; remained in service. 9 dead.
- Tennessee: hit by two bombs; returned to service February 1942. 5 dead.
- Maryland: hit by two bombs; returned to service February 1942. 4 dead (including floatplane pilot shot down).

=== Ex-battleship (target/AA training ship) ===
- Utah: hit by two torpedoes, capsized; total loss, salvage stopped. 64 dead. Later memorialized.

=== Cruisers ===
- Helena: hit by one torpedo; returned to service January 1942. 20 dead.
- Raleigh: hit by one torpedo; returned to service February 1942.
- Honolulu: near miss, light damage; remained in service.

=== Destroyers ===
- Cassin: in drydock with Downes and Pennsylvania, hit by one bomb, burned; reconstructed and returned to service February 1944.
- Downes: in drydock with Cassin and Pennsylvania, caught fire from Cassin, burned; reconstructed and returned to service November 1943.
- Helm: underway to West Loch, damaged by two near-miss bombs; continued patrol; dry-docked January 15, 1942, and sailed January 20, 1942.
- Shaw: hit by three bombs; returned to service June 1942.

=== Auxiliaries ===
- Oglala (minelayer): damaged by torpedo hit on Helena, capsized; returned to service (as engine-repair ship) February 1944.
- Vestal (repair ship): hit by two bombs, blast and fire from Arizona, beached; returned to service by August 1942.
- Curtiss (seaplane tender): hit by one bomb, one crashed Japanese aircraft; returned to service January 1942. 19 dead.
- Sotoyomo (harbor tug): damaged by explosion and fires in Shaw; sunk; returned to service August 1942.
- YFD-2 (yard floating dock): damaged by bombs; sunk; returned to service January 25, 1942, servicing Shaw.

== Salvage ==
After a systematic search for survivors, Captain Homer N. Wallin was ordered to lead a formal salvage operation. (Note: Wallin had been assigned to go to Massawa in East Africa. The harbor there was blocked by scuttled Italian and German ships, which prevented British use of the port. Commander Edward Ellsberg was sent instead.)

Around Pearl Harbor, divers from the Navy (shore and tenders), the Pearl Harbor Naval Shipyard, and civilian contractors (Pacific Bridge Company and others) began work on the ships that could be refloated. They patched holes, cleared debris, and pumped water out of ships. Melvin Storer and other Navy divers worked inside the damaged ships. Within six months, five battleships and two cruisers were patched or refloated so they could be sent to shipyards in Pearl Harbor and on the mainland for extensive repair.

Intensive salvage operations continued for another year, a total of some 20,000 man-hours under water. Arizona and the target ship Utah were too heavily damaged for salvage and remain where they were sunk, with Arizona becoming a war memorial. Oklahoma, while raised, was never repaired and capsized while under tow to the mainland in 1947. Nevada proved particularly difficult to raise and repair; two men involved in the operation died after inhaling poisonous gases that had accumulated in the ship's interior. When feasible, armament and equipment were removed from vessels too damaged to repair and put to use to improve the anti-aircraft defense of the harbor or installed aboard other craft.

== News coverage ==
=== Coverage in the United States ===
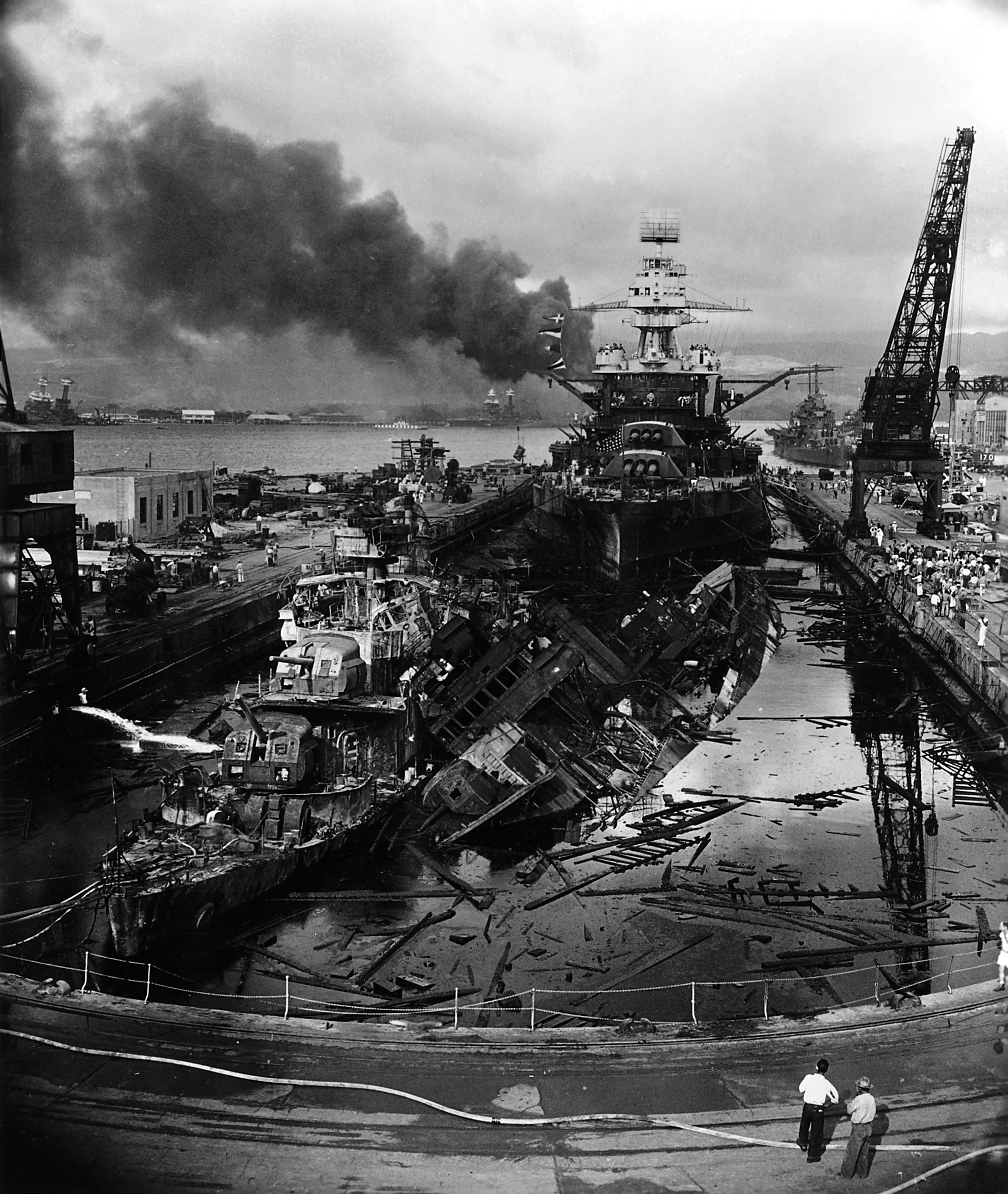
The Pennsylvania behind the wreckage of Downes and Cassin

The initial announcement of the attack on Pearl Harbor was made by the White House Press Secretary, Stephen Early, at 2:22 p.m. Eastern time (8:52 a.m. Hawaiian time): "The Japanese have attacked Pearl Harbor from the air and all naval and military activities on the island of Oahu, principal American base in the Hawaiian islands." As information developed, Early made a number of additional announcements to approximately 150 White House reporters over the course of the afternoon.

Initial reports of the attack moved on news wires at approximately 2:25 p.m. Eastern time. The first radio coverage (which, at the time, represented the earliest opportunity for ordinary people to learn of the attack) was on the CBS radio network's scheduled news program, World News Today, at 2:30 p.m. Eastern time. John Charles Daly read the initial report, then switched to London, where Robert Trout ad-libbed on the possible London reaction. The first report on NBC cut into a play, a dramatization of The Inspector-General, at 2:33 p.m. Eastern time and lasted only 21 seconds. Unlike the later practice with major news stories, there were only brief interruptions of scheduled commercial programming.

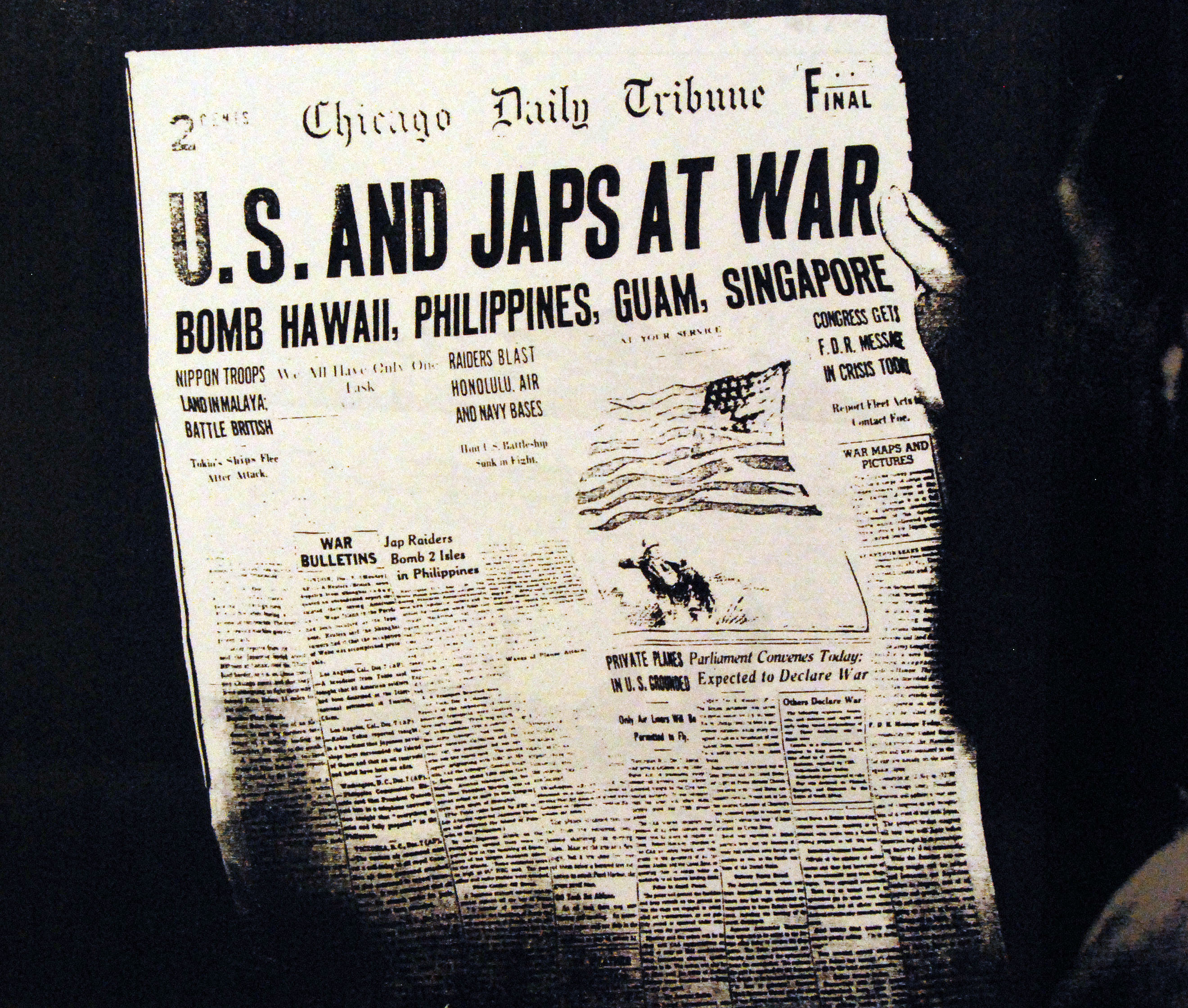
The front page of the Chicago Tribune, December 8, 1941

The attacks were covered on television but the extent of it was limited; as commercial television had started just six months earlier, "a few thousand TV sets existed" in the United States, with most being in the Greater New York City area, and only a handful of stations existed which were all in New York, Chicago, Los Angeles and Philadelphia. WNBT from New York was the only TV station that was regularly airing that day in the country, with the comedy movie Millionaire Playboy, which was scheduled for 3:30-4:30 PM, being interrupted with the news of the attack. The other station known to cover the attacks was WCBW, also out of New York, where a special report on the attack was broadcast that evening. There are no recordings of either station's coverage, either visual or audio.

At the time of the attack, the last three regular season National Football League games were happening. The Chicago Bears were playing the Chicago Cardinals at Comiskey Park; the Brooklyn Dodgers were playing the New York Giants at the Polo Grounds; and the Philadelphia Eagles were playing the Washington Redskins at Washington's Griffith Stadium. All three games were in progress as the attacks began, and no official announcements were made at any of the games concerning the attacks, with many fans finding out from phone calls placed at the stadium or from newsboys outside the stadium. However, throughout the Redskins game, happening in Washington, many military, government and diplomatic personnel were asked to call their offices or return to them. At the Giants game, OSS head, Col. William J. Donovan, was paged to call his office immediately, and all military personnel were asked to return to their stations at the conclusion of the game. The Washington game, thanks to the announcements and general curiosity of the happenings, ended in a near-empty stadium. When asked why an announcement was not made at his game, Redskins owner George Preston Marshall simply stated, "I didn't want to divert the fans' attention from the game."

A contemporaneous newspaper report compared the attack to the Battle of Port Arthur in which the Imperial Japanese Navy attacked the Imperial Russian Navy, triggering the Russo-Japanese War, 37 years prior. Modern writers have continued to note parallels between the attacks, albeit more dispassionately.

=== Coverage in Japan ===
News of the attack was first broadcast at 11:30 AM (Japanese Standard Time), however it had already been announced "shortly after" 7 AM (Japanese Standard Time) that Japan had "entered into a situation of war with the United States and Britain in the Western Pacific before dawn". There was no further elaboration or explanation, and the attacks were already finished by that time. The attack on Pearl Harbor was eventually covered in the Japanese press, but press in wartime Japan was heavily censored. One Japanese newspaper, The Asahi Shimbun did report on the attack the day it occurred, and from that point onward their editorials began to back governmental decisions regardless of what they were. The Asahi Shimbun also reported the declaration of war on the United States after the attacks, framing it as an Imperial Order, with most Japanese people taking it that way. In contrast, coverage in The New York Times focused on "the danger to democracy and to the nation" brought on by the Japanese attack. NHK broadcast twelve special news reports along with its six regularly scheduled ones that day. NHK covered the news of Pearl Harbor and other attacks positively throughout the rest of the month.

=== Coverage elsewhere ===
The United Kingdom's BBC broadcast news of the attack and that Manila was also under attack.

== Aftermath ==
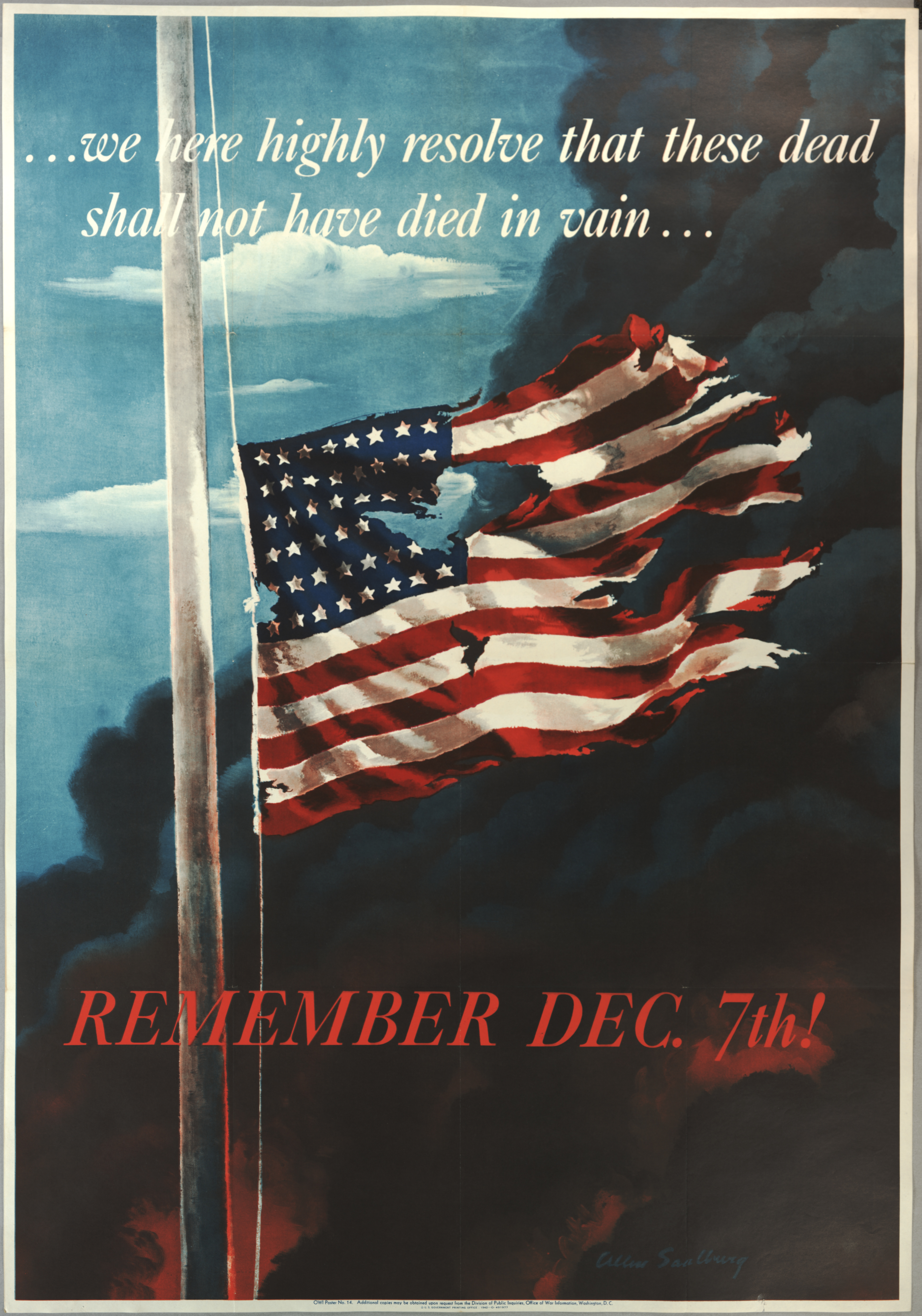
A 1942 poster by Allen Saalburg issued by the United States Office of War Information

The day after the attack, US president Franklin D. Roosevelt delivered his famous Day of Infamy speech to a Joint Session of Congress, calling for a formal declaration of war on the Empire of Japan. Congress obliged his request less than an hour later. On December 11, Germany and Italy declared war on the United States, even though the Tripartite Pact did not require it. (Note: However, one of the pact's objectives was to limit US intervention in conflicts involving the three nations.) Congress issued a declaration of war against Germany and Italy later that same day.

The United Kingdom had already been at war with Germany since September 1939 and with Italy since June 1940, and British prime minister Winston Churchill had promised to declare war "within the hour" of a Japanese attack on the United States. Upon learning of the Japanese attacks on Malaya, Singapore, and Hong Kong, Churchill promptly determined there was no need to either wait or further consult the US government and immediately summoned the Japanese ambassador. As a result, the United Kingdom declared war on Japan nine hours before the United States did.

The attack was a shock to all the Allies in the Pacific Theater. Further losses compounded the alarming setback. Japan began the Philippines campaign (1941–1942) hours later (because of the time difference, it was December 8 in the Philippines). Only three days after the attack on Pearl Harbor, Prince of Wales and Repulse were sunk off Malaya. Churchill recollected "In all the war I never received a more direct shock. As I turned and twisted in bed the full horror of the news sank in upon me. There were no British or American capital ships in the Indian Ocean or the Pacific except the American survivors of Pearl Harbor who were hastening back to California. Over this vast expanse of waters, Japan was supreme and we everywhere were weak and naked."

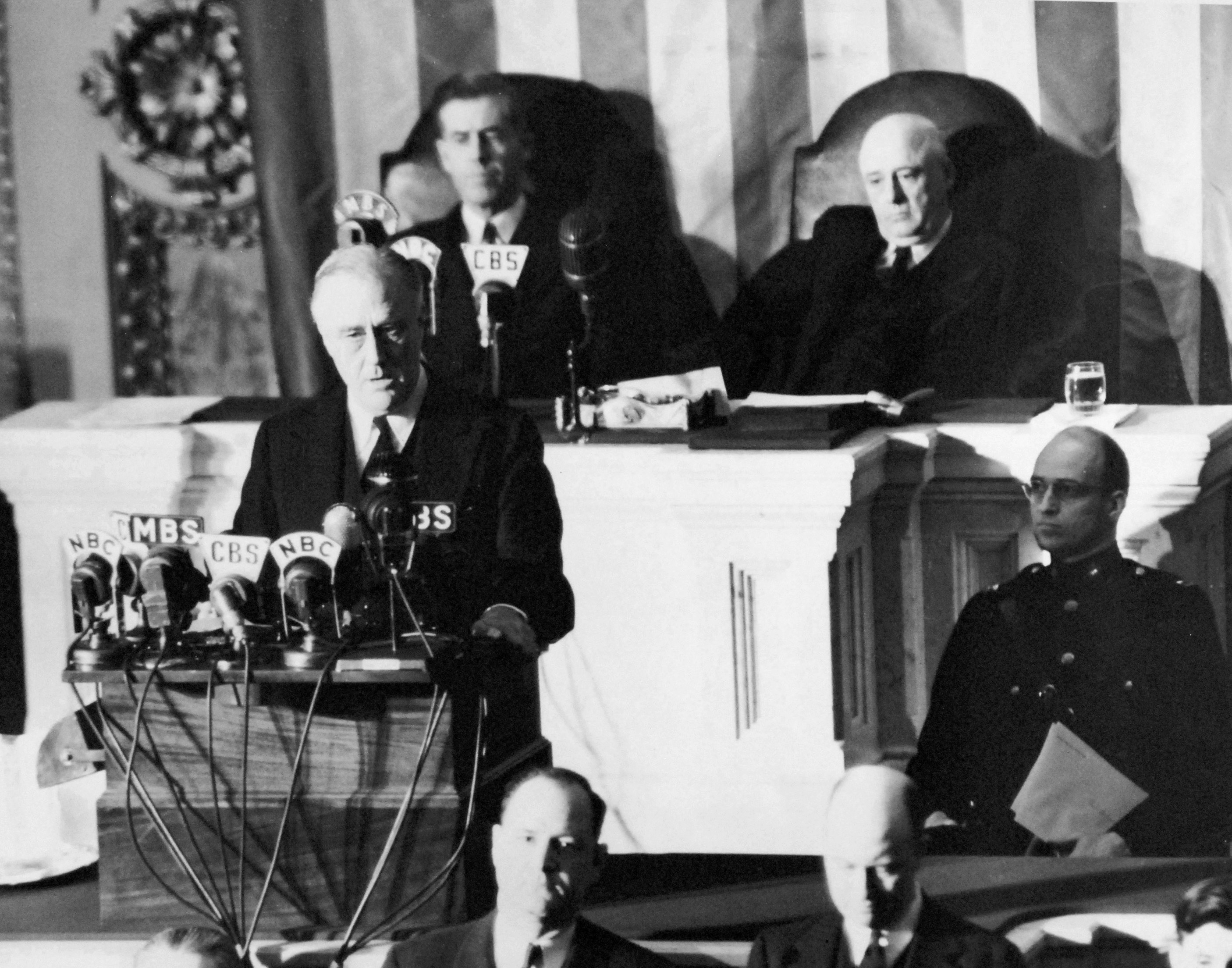
President Franklin D. Roosevelt delivering the "Infamy Speech" to Congress, requesting a declaration of war, December 8, 1941.

Throughout the war, Pearl Harbor was frequently used in American propaganda. The bombing of Pearl Harbor would not persuade controversial Detroit area priest Charles Coughlin to support US entry into World War II, with Coughlin even alleging that Jews had planned the war for their own benefit and had conspired to involve the United States.

One further consequence of the attack on Pearl Harbor and its aftermath (notably the Niʻihau incident) was that Japanese-American residents and citizens were imprisoned in nearby Japanese-American internment camps. Within hours of the attack, hundreds of Japanese-American leaders were rounded up and taken to high-security camps such as Sand Island at the mouth of Honolulu harbor and Kilauea Military Camp on the island of Hawaii. Eventually, more than 110,000 Japanese Americans, nearly all who lived on the West Coast, were forced into interior camps, but in Hawaii, where the 150,000-plus Japanese Americans composed over one-third of the population, only 1,200 to 1,800 were interned.

The attack also had international consequences. The Canadian province of British Columbia, bordering the Pacific Ocean, had long had a large population of Japanese immigrants and their Japanese-Canadian descendants. Pre-war tensions were exacerbated by the Pearl Harbor attack, leading to a reaction from the government of Canada. On February 24, 1942, Order-in-Council P.C. no. 1486 was issued under the War Measures Act, allowing for the forced removal of any and all Canadians of Japanese descent from British Columbia and prohibiting them from returning to the province. On March 4, regulations under the act were adopted to expel Japanese Canadians. As a result, 12,000 were interned in interior camps, 2,000 were sent to road camps, and another 2,000 were forced to work in the prairies on sugar beet farms.

In the wake of the attack, fifteen Medals of Honor, fifty-one Navy Crosses, fifty-three Silver Stars, four Navy and Marine Corps Medals, one Distinguished Flying Cross, four Distinguished Service Crosses, one Distinguished Service Medal, and three Bronze Star Medals were awarded to the American servicemen who distinguished themselves in combat at Pearl Harbor. Additionally, a special military award, the Pearl Harbor Commemorative Medal, was later authorized for all military veterans of the attack.

=== Niʻihau incident ===
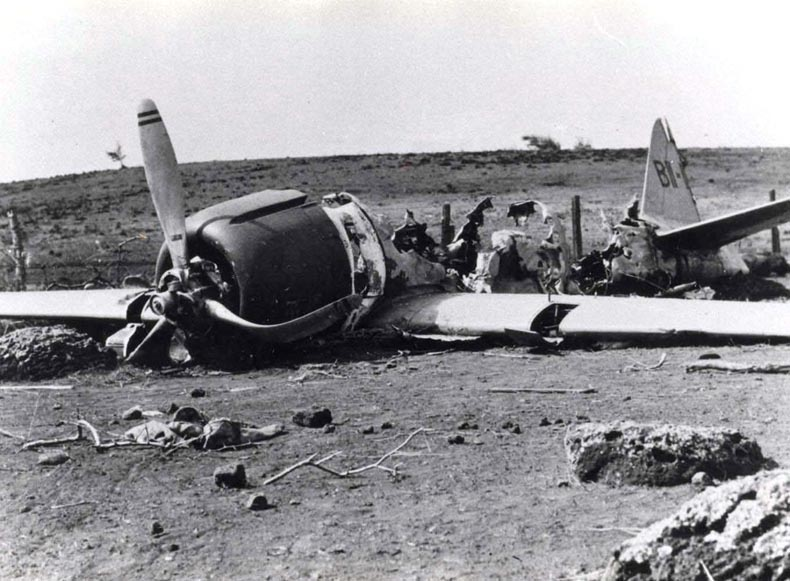
Petty Officer Shigenori Nishikaichi's aircraft ten days after it crashed

Japanese planners of the Pearl Harbor attack had determined that some means were required for rescuing fliers whose aircraft were damaged too badly to return to the carriers. The island of Niʻihau, only thirty minutes by air from Pearl Harbor, was designated as the rescue point.

During the second wave, a Zero fighter flown by Petty Officer Shigenori Nishikaichi of Hiryu was damaged in the attack on Wheeler, so he flew to the rescue point. The aircraft was further damaged on his crash landing. Nishikaichi was helped from the wreckage by one of the Native Hawaiians, who, aware of the tension between the United States and Japan, took the pilot's pistol, maps, codes and other documents. The island's residents had no telephones or radios and were completely unaware of the attack on Pearl Harbor. Nishikaichi enlisted the support of three Japanese-American residents in an attempt to recover the documents. During the ensuing struggles, Nishikaichi was killed, and a Hawaiian civilian was wounded; one collaborator committed suicide, and his wife and the third collaborator were sent to prison.

The ease with which the local ethnic Japanese residents had apparently gone to Nishikaichi's assistance was a source of concern for many and tended to support those who believed that local Japanese could not be trusted.

=== Strategic implications ===
Rear Admiral Chūichi Hara summed up the Japanese result by saying, "We won a great tactical victory at Pearl Harbor and thereby lost the war."

While the attack accomplished its intended objective, it turned out to be largely unnecessary. Unknown to Yamamoto, who conceived the original plan, the United States Navy had decided as far back as 1935 to abandon "charging" across the Pacific towards the Philippines in response to an outbreak of war (in keeping with the evolution of Plan Orange). The United States instead adopted "Plan Dog" in 1940, which emphasized keeping the IJN out of the eastern Pacific and away from the shipping lanes to Australia, while the United States concentrated on defeating Nazi Germany.

Fortunately for the United States, the American aircraft carriers were untouched; otherwise, the Pacific Fleet's ability to conduct offensive operations would have been crippled for a year or more (given no diversions from the Atlantic Fleet). As it was, the Navy was left with no choice but to rely on carriers and submarines. While six of the eight battleships were repaired and returned to service, their relatively low speed and high fuel consumption limited their deployment, and they served mainly in shore bombardment roles (their only major action being the Battle of Surigao Strait in October 1944). A major flaw in Japanese strategic thinking was their reliance on Kantai Kessen, a belief that the ultimate Pacific battle would be fought by battleships, in keeping with the doctrine of Captain Alfred Thayer Mahan. As a result, Yamamoto (and his successors) hoarded battleships for a "decisive battle" that never happened. According to the US Naval Institute, Admiral Chester Nimitz believed that the US was fortunate to have been caught by a surprise attack, instead of having their Pacific Fleet lured out to sea by the Japanese, since the US fleet at that point could never have brought the Japanese fleet into conventional combat, and if they had done so, "The six Japanese carriers could have stood off in deep water and sunk our ships one by one in deep water. We would have lost all the able officers and crews who eventually manned the ships of our new Pacific fleet."

The Japanese confidence in their ability to win a quick victory meant that they neglected Pearl Harbor's navy repair yards, oil tank farms, submarine base, and old headquarters building. All of these targets were omitted from Genda's list, yet they proved more important than any battleship to the American war effort in the Pacific. The survival of the repair shops and fuel depots allowed Pearl Harbor to maintain logistical support of the Navy, such as for the Doolittle Raid, the Battle of the Coral Sea, and the Battle of Midway. It was submarines that immobilized the Imperial Japanese Navy's heavy ships and brought Japan's economy to a virtual standstill by crippling the importation of oil and raw materials: By the end of 1942, the amount of imported raw materials was cut in half "to a disastrous ten million tons", while oil "was almost completely stopped". (Note: In less than eleven months, most of Japan's elite naval aviators who had been at Pearl Harbor were lost in subsequent battles. Lack of fuel and an inflexible training policy meant that they could not be readily replaced.) Lastly, the basement of the Old Administration Building was the home of the cryptanalytic unit that contributed significantly to the Midway ambush and the submarine force's success.

The Japanese failure to follow up their attack on Pearl Harbor with an invasion of Hawaii was also seen as another strategic failure, although experts find it unlikely Japan could have pulled off such a feat. Japan had long seen Hawaii as a part of their planned Pacific empire. As early as 1932 and even 1924, Admiral Seijiro Kawashima and Commander Hironori Mizuno argued that in the event of any war with the United States, Japan needed to take Hawaii, and a failure to do so would doom the war to being prolonged, and keep Japan from being able to win. Before the Pearl Harbor attack, Japanese intelligence officer Kinoaki Matsuo and Japanese Commander Minuro Genda were both in favor of invading Hawaii, believing that such a move was necessary for forcing the US to the negotiating table and winning the war. However, in the wake of discussions following the war games drilling for the Pearl Harbor attack on September 5–17, 1941, Admiral Isoroku Yamamoto ultimately decided against attempting an invasion of Hawaii.

On 9 December, two days after the attack, Admiral Yamamoto apparently changed his mind, and realizing the strategic blunder in failing to seize Oahu, decided to prepare plans for an invasion of Hawaii, which was dubbed the "Yamaguchi Plan". The plan consisted of seizing Midway Island, Johnston Atoll, and Palmyra Island, and imposing a tightening blockade on Oahu. After seizing the Big Island of Hawaii, Oahu would fall to an amphibious assault. However, Japan's decisive defeat at the Battle of Midway in June 1942 permanently scuttled those plans. In the event that Japan had invaded Hawaii, experts believe that the US garrison there would have been unable to put up a cohesive defense, and a occupation of the Hawaiian Islands would have allowed Japan to dominate the central Pacific, and forced the surviving Pacific Fleet to retreat to the US West Coast, giving Japan a chance to control the central Pacific.

=== Debate on the failure of American intelligence ===
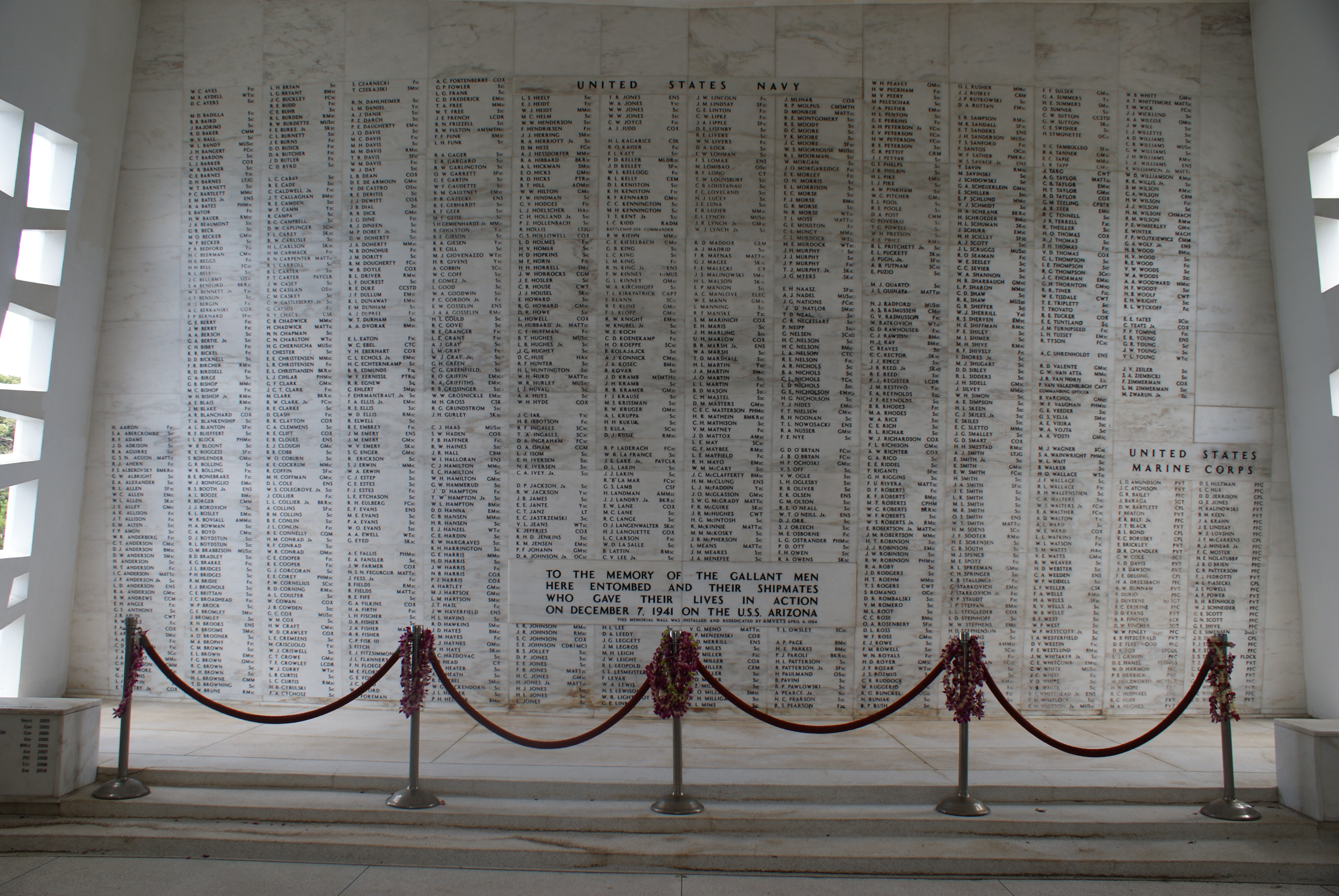
The USS Arizona Memorial

Since the direct aftermath of the attack, there has been debate as to how and why the United States was caught unaware. Various authors and military figures have speculated that U.S. officials were aware of Japanese plans prior to the attack and purposefully failed to prevent it, a view which remains controversial within studies of World War II.

Promoters of the conspiracy theory argue that various parties high in the American and British governments knew of the attack in advance and allowed or encouraged it to force the United States into the war via the so-called "back door." Theorists point to the controversial decision to permanently move the U.S. Pacific Fleet to Pearl Harbor in May 1940 despite mounting tensions with Japan and existing doubts about the area's defensive readiness.

As early as 1924, Chief of United States Air Service Mason Patrick showed concern for military vulnerabilities in the Pacific, having sent General Billy Mitchell on a survey of the Pacific and the East. Patrick called Mitchell's subsequent report, which identified vulnerabilities in Hawaii, a "theoretical treatise on employment of airpower in the Pacific, which, in all probability undoubtedly will be of extreme value some 10 or 15 years hence". At least two naval war games, one in 1932 and another in 1936, proved that Pearl Harbor was vulnerable to such an attack. Admiral James Richardson was removed from command shortly after protesting President Roosevelt's decision to move the bulk of the Pacific fleet to Pearl Harbor.

Notable supporters of the theory include World War II veteran and journalist Robert Stinnett, author of Day of Deceit, and former United States Rear Admiral Robert Alfred Theobald, author of The Final Secret of Pearl Harbor: The Washington Background of the Pearl Harbor Attack. (Note: Gordon Prange specifically addresses some revisionist works, including Charles A. Beard, President Roosevelt and the Coming War 1941; William Henry Chamberlin, America's Second Crusade; John T. Flynn, The Roosevelt Myth; George Morgenstern, Pearl Harbor; Frederic R. Sanborn, Design for War; Robert Alfred Theobald, The Final Secret of Pearl Harbor; Harry E. Barnes, ed., Perpetual War for Perpetual Peace and The Court Historians versus Revisionism; Husband E. Kimmel, Admiral Kimmel's Story.) The theory is also supported by Dick Ellis, a British-Australian intelligence officer for MI6 who served as deputy to William Stephenson at British Security Co-ordination. According to Ellis, Stephenson was convinced by intelligence that an attack by the Japanese was imminent and informed President Roosevelt's son, Jimmy Roosevelt.

The theory is largely met with skepticism by both survivors of the attack and mainstream historians. Skeptics point to the theorists' reliance on conjecture, a lack of substantial evidence, and a host of alternative explanations.

World War II historian Warren Kimball asserts the implausibility of the theory:

Why would Franklin Roosevelt, who adored his navy, sacrifice what was then considered a crucial and decisive weapon, the battleship fleet, when they might have set a trap for the Japanese, delivering a crushing blow against the Imperial Navy, and slipped through the "back door" into a war with Germany? In the absence of a unequivocal and undeniable smoking gun, the "FDR must have known" school flunks out.

In his book Intelligence and Surprise Attack, Brown University professor Eric J. Dahl acknowledges the failure of U.S. commanders to take proper precautions against an attack, and the existence of intelligence which suggested an imminent attack on Pearl Harbor. However, Dahl argues, primary sources indicate that U.S. intelligence officers did not maliciously ignore these reports but rather did not take them seriously. Neither did Kimmel or Short, who instead focused on preparing the fleet for offensive attacks when war did eventually break out. As such, Roosevelt and his senior advisors were not made aware of these reports.

== See also ==
- Attack on Pearl Harbor in popular culture
- List of Medal of Honor recipients for the Attack on Pearl Harbor
- National Pearl Harbor Remembrance Day
- Operation K (1942 raid on Pearl Harbor)
- Pearl Harbor National Memorial
- Pearl Harbor Survivors Association
- Strafing off Barber's Point
- Winds Code
- Tondern raid (a 1918 raid on a Zeppelin base)
- Attacks on the United States
