= List of works by Gore Vidal =

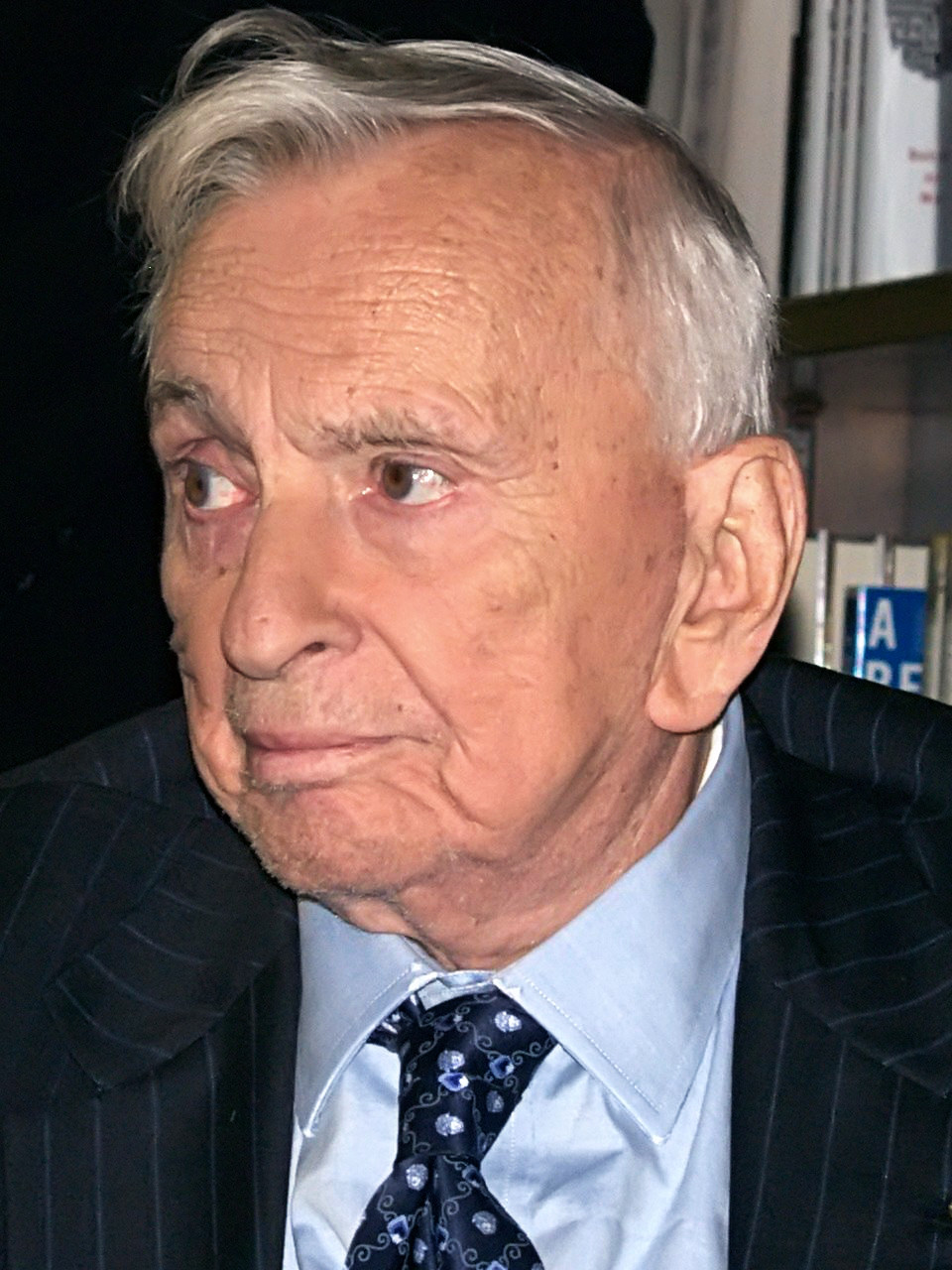
Vidal in 2009

Gore Vidal was an American writer and screenwriter who worked in a wide variety of genres.

== Non-fiction ==
=== Books ===
- Rocking the Boat (1963)
- Reflections Upon a Sinking Ship (1969)
- Sex, Death and Money (1969) (paperback compilation)
- Homage to Daniel Shays: Collected Essays, 1952–1972 (1972) ISBN 0-394-71950-6
- Matters of Fact and of Fiction (1977)
- Sex is Politics and Vice Versa (1979), limited edition by Sylvester & Orphanos
- Views from a Window Co-Editor (1981)
- Pink Triangle and Yellow Star: Essays 1976-1982 (1982)
- The Second American Revolution (1983)
- Vidal In Venice (1985) ISBN 0-671-60691-3
- Armageddon? Essays 1983-1987 (1987) (UK only)
- At Home: Essays 1982-1988 (1988) (US only)
- A View From The Diners Club: Essays 1987-1991 (1991) (UK only)
- Screening History (1992) ISBN 0-233-98803-3
- Decline and Fall of the American Empire (1992) ISBN 1-878825-00-3
- United States: Essays 1952–1992 (1993) ISBN 0-7679-0806-6 – National Book Award
- Palimpsest: A Memoir. New York: Random House. 1995. ISBN 9780679440383.
- Virgin Islands: Essays 1992-1997 (1997) (UK only)
- The American Presidency (1998) ISBN 1-878825-15-1
- Sexually Speaking: Collected Sex Writings (1999)
- The Last Empire: Essays 1992–2000 (2001) ISBN 0-375-72639-X (there is also a much shorter UK edition)
- Perpetual War for Perpetual Peace or How We Came To Be So Hated, Thunder's Mouth Press, 2002, (2002) ISBN 1-56025-405-X
- Dreaming War: Blood for Oil and the Cheney-Bush Junta, Thunder's Mouth Press, (2002) ISBN 1-56025-502-1
- Inventing a Nation: Washington, Adams, Jefferson (2003) ISBN 0-300-10171-6
- Imperial America: Reflections on the United States of Amnesia (2004) ISBN 1-56025-744-X
- Point to Point Navigation: A Memoir (2006) ISBN 0-385-51721-1
- The Selected Essays of Gore Vidal (2008) ISBN 0-385-52484-6
- Gore Vidal: Snapshots in History's Glare (2009) ISBN 0-8109-5049-9
- I Told You So: Gore Vidal Talks Politics: Interviews with Jon Wiener (2013) ISBN 978-1-61902-174-7
- Gore Vidal History of the National Security State, The Real News Network, introduction by Paul Jay (2014)
- Buckley vs. Vidal: The Historic 1968 ABC News Debates (2015) ISBN 978-1-942531-12-8

=== Articles ===
- "Notes on Television," The Writer, March 1957

== Fiction ==
=== Novels ===
- Williwaw (1946) ISBN 0-226-85585-6 Also in Project Gutenberg
- In a Yellow Wood (1947)
- The City and the Pillar (1948) ISBN 1-4000-3037-4
- The Season of Comfort (1949) ISBN 0-233-98971-4
- A Search for the King (1950) ISBN 0-345-25455-4
- Dark Green, Bright Red (1950) ISBN 0-233-98913-7 (see "In the Lair of the Octopus" and Dreaming War)
- A Star's Progress (aka Cry Shame!) (1950) as "Katherine Everard"
- The Judgment of Paris (1952) ISBN 0-345-33458-2
- Death in the Fifth Position (1952) under the pseudonym Edgar Box
- Thieves Fall Out (1953) under the pseudonym Cameron Kay
- Death Before Bedtime (1953) under the pseudonym Edgar Box
- Death Likes It Hot (1954) under the pseudonym Edgar Box
- Messiah (1954) ISBN 0-14-118039-0 Also at Project Gutenberg
- Julian (1964) ISBN 0-375-72706-X
- Washington, D.C. (1967), first book in his Narratives of Empire series, ISBN 0-316-90257-8
- Myra Breckinridge (1968) ISBN 1-125-97948-8
- Two Sisters (1970) ISBN 0-434-82958-7
- Burr (1973), second book in his Narratives of Empire series, ISBN 0-375-70873-1
- Myron (1974) ISBN 0-586-04300-4
- 1876 (1976), third book in his Narratives of Empire series,ISBN 0-375-70872-3
- Kalki (1978) ISBN 0-14-118037-4
- Creation (1981) ISBN 0-349-10475-1
- Duluth (1983) ISBN 0-394-52738-0
- Lincoln (1984), fourth book in his Narratives of Empire series, ISBN 0-375-70876-6
- Empire (1987), fifth book in his Narratives of Empire series ISBN 0-375-70874-X
- Hollywood (1990), sixth book in his Narratives of Empire series, ISBN 0-375-70875-8
- Live From Golgotha (1992) ISBN 0-14-023119-6
- The Smithsonian Institution (1998) ISBN 0-375-50121-5
- The Golden Age (2000), seventh and final book in his Narratives of Empire series, ISBN 0-375-72481-8

=== Short story collections ===
- A Thirsty Evil (1956) (short stories)
- Three by Box: The Complete Mysteries of Edgar Box (1978) ISBN 0-394-50117-9
- Clouds and Eclipses: The Collected Short Stories (2006) The anthology A Thirsty Evil (1956), with the additional short story "Clouds and Eclipses"

=== Plays ===
- Visit to a Small Planet (1957) ISBN 0-8222-1211-0
- The Best Man (1960)
- On the March to the Sea (1960–61, 2004)
- Romulus (adapted from Friedrich Dürrenmatt's 1950 play Romulus der Große) (1962)
- Weekend (1968)
- Drawing Room Comedy (1970)
- An Evening with Richard Nixon (1970) ISBN 0-394-71869-0
- On the March to the Sea (2005)

=== Screenplays and teleplays ===
- Climax!: A Farewell to Arms (1955); Dr. Jekyll & Mr. Hyde (1955) (TV adaptations)
- The Best of Broadway (1955): TV adaptation of Stage Door
- The Catered Affair (1956)
- I Accuse! (1958)
- The Left Handed Gun (1958)
- The Scapegoat (1959)
- Ben Hur (1959) (uncredited)
- Suddenly, Last Summer (1959)
- The Best Man (1964)
- Is Paris Burning? (1966)
- Last of the Mobile Hot Shots (1970)
- Caligula (1979)
- Dress Gray (1986)
- The Sicilian (1987) (uncredited)
- Billy the Kid (1989)
- The Palermo Connection (1989)
