= Two Sisters (novel) =

1970 memoir by Gore Vidal

- Cover of the first edition
- Author: Gore Vidal
- Language: English
- Publisher: Heinemann
- Publication date: 1970
- Publication place: United States
- Media type: Print
- Pages: 174
- ISBN: 0-434-82958-7
- Preceded by: Myra Breckinridge
- Followed by: Burr

Two Sisters is a novelistic memoir by the American writer Gore Vidal. Originally published in 1970, this fairly short novel (174 pages) contains, according to the blurb on the dust jacket of the first edition, "Gore Vidal’s singular speculations on love, sex, death, literature and politics."

Reviewing the book in The New York Times, reviewer John Leonard complained, ""Two Sisters" works neither as a novel (all the news happens off-stage) nor as a memoir (the "I" is far too coy)."
