= Smithsonian (disambiguation) =

The Smithsonian Institution, or simply The Smithsonian, is a group of museums and research centers in the U.S.

Smithsonian may also refer to:

- Smithsonian (magazine), the official journal of the Smithsonian Institution
- Smithsonian Channel, an American pay television channel
- Smithsonian Folkways, a record label of the Smithsonian Institution
- Smithsonian station, a station of the Washington Metro
- The Smithsonian Institution (novel), a 1998 novel by Gore Vidal
- 3773 Smithsonian, an asteroid

== See also ==
- James Smithson
- Smithsonian Institution Building, in Washington, D.C.
- Smithsonian Agreement, 1971, created a new dollar standard
