= Lincoln (novel) =

1984 novel by Gore Vidal

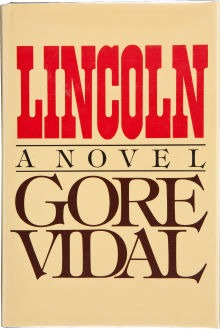
- Cover of the first edition
- Author: Gore Vidal
- Language: English
- Series: Narratives of Empire
- Genre: Historical novel
- Publisher: Random House
- Publication date: 1984
- Publication place: United States
- Media type: Print (Hardback & Paperback)
- Pages: 672 pp
- ISBN: 0-375-70876-6
- OCLC: 43479239
- Preceded by: Burr
- Followed by: 1876

Lincoln: A Novel is a 1984 historical novel, part of the Narratives of Empire series by Gore Vidal. The novel describes the presidency of Abraham Lincoln and extends from the start of the American Civil War until his assassination. Rather than focus on the Civil War itself, the novel is centred on Lincoln's political and personal struggles. Though Lincoln is the focus, the book is never narrated from his point of view (with the exception of several paragraphs describing a dream Lincoln had shortly before his death); Vidal instead writes from the perspective of key historical figures. He draws from contemporary diaries, memoirs, letters, newspaper accounts, the biographical writings of John Hay and John Nicolay (Lincoln's secretaries), and the work of modern historians.

== Style, plot, and themes ==
=== Style ===
The novel is part of Gore Vidal’s ‘Narratives of Empire’ series and joins his other works; Burr (1973), 1876 (1976) and Washington D.C. (1967) as chronicles of America. In the series, Vidal offers works of historical fiction that reinterpret American history starting from the American Revolution to beyond World War II. The book is never narrated from Lincoln’s perspective. Rather, the reader views Lincoln through the eyes of his enemies, friends, political rivalries and even those who sought to kill him. Significant characters include Lincoln’s cabinet secretaries; William Seward, Salmon Chase as well as Kate Sprague, John Hay, Mary Todd Lincoln and David Herold. Much of the writing is presented through dramatic, flamboyant dialogue. Vidal favours this over narration or observational writing, attempting to convey his wit and charisma through his characters. The novel is not simply a work of historical fiction, but with Lincoln's personal and political development it is also a Bildungsroman. Lincoln's development starts with the slow mobilisation and unification of his inner Cabinet, climaxes with his military victory and political restoration of the Union and is completed with his assassination

Lincoln, in some mysterious fashion, had willed his own murder as a form of atonement for the great and terrible thing that he had done by giving so bloody and absolute a rebirth to his nation.

=== Plot ===
The novel commences on February 23, 1861 as Lincoln, the president elect, is traveling to Washington for his inauguration. It is in Washington where the majority of the novel is set. Washington is depicted as turbulent and deteriorating with infestations of pests, poor infrastructure, a Capitol building without a dome and an incomplete Washington Monument. The novel comprises Lincoln’s two terms of office through the American civil war. It offers a detailed and extensive narrative, with the book totaling over 650 pages. It focuses on Lincoln's efforts to unite and mobilize political adversaries and military strategists to win the war. It is through the various perspectives of other characters that Vidal portrays an ambitious visionary who struggles with an unstable marriage, physical ailments and the failing trust of his fellow cabinet members. The novel also explores Lincoln’s growth as he overcomes these personal and political burdens to triumph and preserve the union. Vidal completes the novel with President Lincoln’s assassination.

=== Themes ===
The central thematic development is the reinterpretation of the idealistic, sentimental ‘Honest Abe.’ Vidal depicts a politically cunning, dictatorial leader whose primary motivation was not the liberation of African American slaves nor adherence to the Constitution, but the preservation of the Union. Vidal even goes far enough to contend that Lincoln held an unshaken belief of white superiority and was willing to 'bend the Constitution,' although this has been significantly criticised. Vidal believes that it was Lincoln's willingness to act unilaterally and suspend democratic principles such as habeas corpus that allowed him to succeed in his unflinching pursuit of unification. He jailed hostile newspaper editors, political opponents and even employed the Secret Service to inspect private communications.

Vidal follows the complex politics of the cabinet and congress. Initially, Lincoln faces political opponents who constantly doubt and undermine his leadership. Indeed, many characters describe Lincoln as mild-mannered and weak. However, as the novel progresses, they and the reader come to understand that Lincoln purposely and cleverly masks his true emotions and intentions. Vidal contends that Lincoln's greatest leadership quality is his introverted nature. Dealing with treacherous politicians, arrogant generals and critics, Lincoln was shrewd and cunning to masterfully navigate the United States to unification as a Republic. Despite the incompetent military strategists and petty, squabbling politicians, Lincoln was aware that his primary goal was to hold the North together for as long as possible. This was because the battle was one of attrition and Lincoln knew that the South's smaller population would be exhausted first.

Ultimately, even Lincoln's political rivalries come to respect his leadership. William Seward, once a fierce opponent and underminer of Lincoln transforms into a devoted servant.

I may once have wanted—even lusted—for power, but all that has been burned away. There is nothing left of me. But there is still the President.

There were also shortcomings of Lincoln. He is depicted as hopelessly naive in dealing with the remarkable costs of financing the war and dealing with the US Treasury. He also struggles as a father. His son, Robert, confides in Hay and reveals that he feels neglected. He comes to resent his father's political ambition that caused him to be so preoccupied and distant. His wife's mood swings and insatiable spending further challenge Lincoln's stoicism; whilst the marriage is turbulent, the two seem to share a strong bond.

With frequent light-hearted ‘outlandish’ anecdotes and humour, Vidal sought to explore the human side of Lincoln. Vidal perceived Lincoln's humour as a necessity to dealing with his many great burdens.

== Characters ==
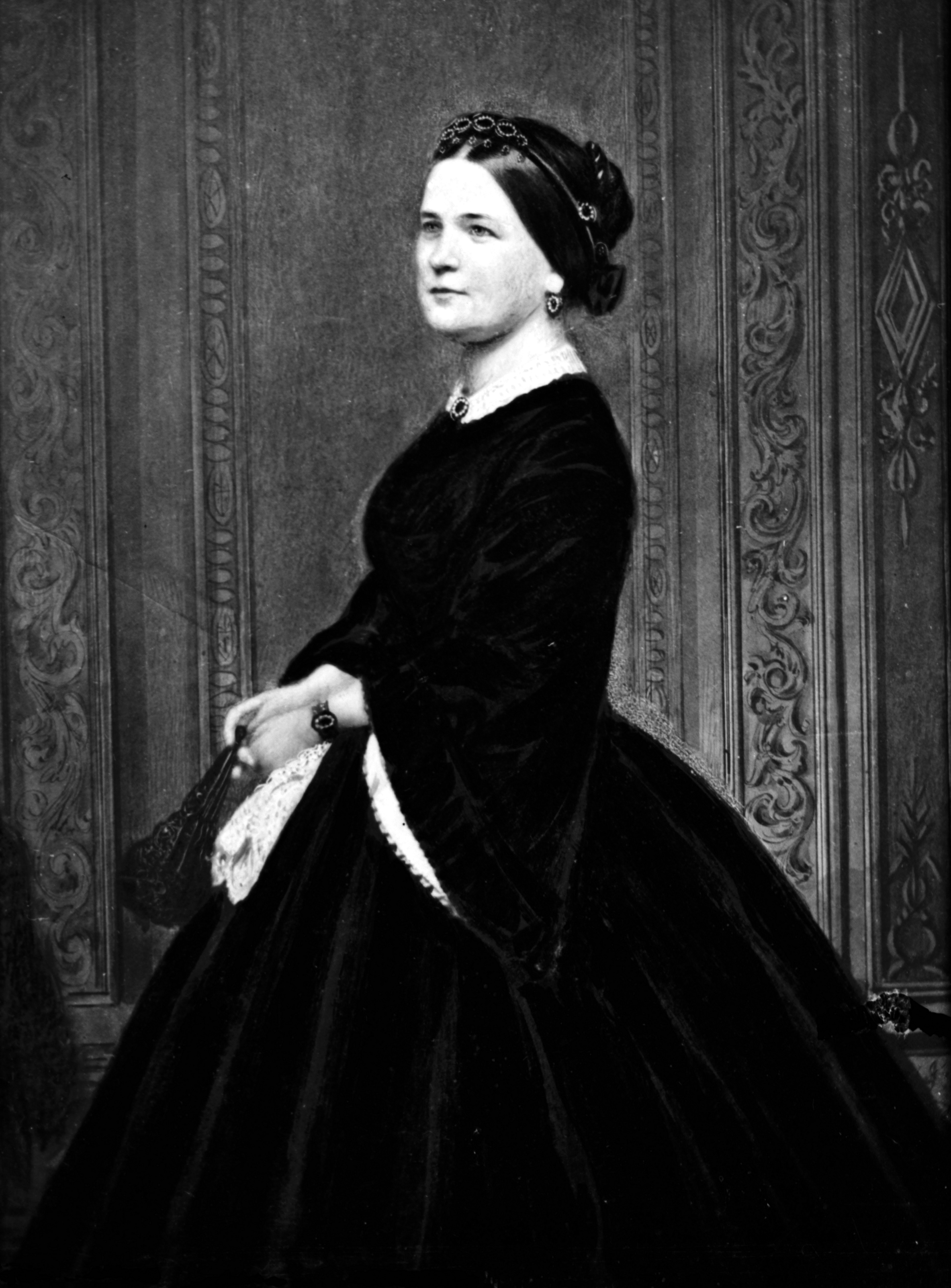
Portrait of Mary Todd Lincoln taken during 1860-65

=== Mary Todd Lincoln ===
Lincoln deeply loved his wife and struggled greatly with her mental collapse. She is depicted as a vulnerability in Lincoln's political tactics, frequently clashing with Congressman.

Nonetheless, Vidal's representation of Mary is mostly positive. She is seen as an intelligent and decent person who unfortunately succumbs to fits of insanity characterised by wild mood swings and insatiable spending.

=== John Hay ===
John Hay was Lincoln's personal secretary. He is represented as a close friend and confidant of Lincoln. He was a young man at the time of Lincoln's presidency and was energetic and high-spirited, even through the more challenging times of the war.

=== William Seward ===
Seward was the U.S Secretary of State and is depicted as a handsome, yet politically cunning rival of Lincoln. Initially Seward was a believer that the Southern States should be allowed to pursue their legal right of independence; however, under Lincoln's leadership he came to understand the importance of unification. He was an outspoken member of Lincoln's cabinet, and oversaw the war effort.

=== Salmon P. Chase ===
Chase was Lincoln's Secretary of the U.S Treasury during most of his first term in office, and is depicted as being as interested in developing his candidacy for the 1864 presidential election as he was in his cabinet role. He, like many other politicians, doubted Lincoln's leadership ability, believing that only a more radical abolitionist than Lincoln (someone like Chase himself) would be able to guide the country through its time of great peril. Lincoln shrewdly neutralized Chase's insurgent candidacy for the Republican nomination in 1864 and Chase is left humbled and with limited prospects.

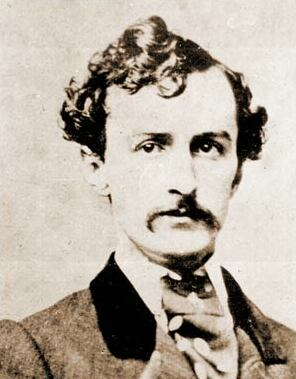
John Booth, Lincoln's assassin

=== David Herold and John Wilkes Booth ===
Herold and Booth are the co-conspirators who devised and successfully executed a plan to assassinate Lincoln.

Herold despises Lincoln's attempts at unification. He is depicted as unintelligent and frequently engages in debauchery, visiting brothels in Washington. He fantasizes about being a hero of the Confederacy and even poisoning the President through his job as a pharmacy clerk. He eventually finds a group of like-minded individuals who also seek to kill Lincoln, and it is here where he meets Booth.

John Booth is the assassin of Lincoln. Booth is not as incompetent as Herold, but is also a hate-filled enemy of Lincoln. He seeks to avenge the defeat of the South, and stalks Lincoln throughout the novel, swearing revenge. His narrative climaxes with the assassination of Lincoln and subsequent daring escape.

=== List of named characters ===
The characters in Lincoln include dozens of historical as well as purely fictional figures. This list of named characters includes those that appear or are mentioned in the novel. They are listed in order of appearance or mention (mentions marked with an *).

Part 1 – Ch 1

- Elihu Washburne – Congressman from Illinois
  - Gautier – DC caterer, rumored to be the lost Dauphin
- William Seward – Senator from NY, Lincoln’s rival for Republican nomination
- Pinkerton – Detective, Lincoln’s bodyguard
- Abraham Lincoln – President elect, then President
- Ward Hill Lamon – Lincoln’s bodyguard, later Constable of DC
- General Winfield Scott – Commander of the US Army, victor of Mexican War
- Mary Todd Lincoln – First lady
- Robert Lincoln – Lincoln’s son
  - Widow Spriggs – Lincoln’s DC landlady in the 1840s
- James Buchanan – Lame duck 15th president
  - William Dodge – NY merchant
- Mike – porter at Willard’s Hotel
  - Stephen Douglas – Northern Democratic presidential candidate, defeated by Lincoln
  - John Breckinridge – Southern Democratic presidential candidate, defeated by Lincoln
  - John Tyler – former president
  - Zachary Taylor – former president
- Salmon P. Chase – Abolitionist, Senator from OH, Lincoln’s Treasury Secretary
  - Edward Bates – Whig politician
- Gideon Welles – Democrat, Lincoln’s Secretary of the Navy
  - Thurlow Weed – Publisher of the Albany Evening Journal

Ch 2

- David Herold – Pharmacy clerk, Washington Wild Boy, former brothel handyman
- Annie Surrat – David’s friend
- Mrs. Surrat – Annie’s mother, owner of a Maryland truck farm
- John Surrat – owner of a Maryland truck farm, dying
- John Surrat – Son of Mr. and Mrs. Surrat, catholic, studying for priesthood
- Isaac Surrat – Son of Mr. and Mrs. Surrat, engineer
- Mrs. Herold – David’s mother, furniture store proprietress
  - Jefferson Davis – president of confederacy
- Sarah “Sal” Austin – Madam
- Julia – Madam

Ch 3

  - James Polk – Former president when Lincoln was in congress
- Edward McManus – White House doorkeeper, “Old Edward”
- Harriet Lane – President Buchanan’s niece, de facto first lady
  - the Other Edward – President Buchanan’s waiting room manager
- Edwin Stanton – Buchanan’s Attorney General, later special counsel to Secretary of War; later Lincoln’s second Secretary of War
  - Mr Floyd – Secretary of War under Buchanan
  - Robert E Lee – Army colonel
  - Major Anderson – Union officer in charge of Ft Sumter

Ch 4

- John Hay – Lincoln’s secretary, appointed to position at Treasury Dept
- John George Nicolay – Lincoln’s secretary
  - William Herndon – Lincoln’s law partner in Springfield
- Tad Lincoln – Lincoln’s son (7)
- Willie Lincoln – Lincoln’s son (10)
- Charles Sumner – Senator from MA, abolitionist
- Sarah Helen Whitman – Providence poet, professor, one-time fiancée of EA Poe
  - Henry Clay – Senator from KY
  - William Cullen Bryant – Editor of New York Evening Post
  - Horace Greeley – New York editor
- Henry Adams – Harvard student, friend of Robert Lincoln, son of Charles Francis Adams

Ch 5

  - Simon Cameron – Lincoln’s first Secretary of War
- The Blairs – Political family from MD
  - John Brown – Abolitionist, hanged
  - Reverend Garrison – Abolitionist, imprisoned
- Kate Chase – Chase’s daughter (20) and de facto hostess at his house
  - Nettie Chase – Chase’s daughter (13)
  - Alexander Stephens – Congressman from VA, VP of Confederacy
  - Philip Barton Key – Murder victim, son of Francis Scott Key
  - Dan Sickles – Congressman from NY, acquitted murderer of Key in a fit of jealous rage
- Elizabeth Grimsley – Lincoln’s cousin, “Cousin Lizzie”
  - Eddie Lincoln – Lincoln’s son, deceased at 3 years of age

Ch 7

- Henry D. Cooke – Editor of Ohio State Journal, friend of Chase
- Jay Cooke – Wealthy Philadelphia financier
  - Philander Chase – Episcopalian bishop in Ohio
  - Miss Haines – Finishing schoolmistress
- Francis Preston Blair – The “Old Gentleman,” former editor of the Congressional Globe, friend of Jackson, kingmaker
- Frank Blair – Blair’s son, Republican congressman from Missouri
- Montgomery Blair – Blair’s son, lawyer in Maryland, Lincoln’s Postmaster General

Ch 8

- Scipione Grillo – Musician, restaurateur
- Mr. Scala – Conductor of the Marine Band
- William S. Thompson – Pharmacist, employer of David Herold
- Elvira – Cleaning woman at pharmacy
  - Dr Hardinge – Jefferson Davis’s physician
  - Mr Dayton – Whig politician
- Elmer E. Ellsworth – Drillmaster of the Zouaves
- Hannibal Hamlin – Lincoln’s VP, Senator from Maine
  - Edwin Forest – Actor
- Roger B. Taney – Chief Justice

Ch 9

- James Gordon Bennett – Publisher of New York Herald
- Chester – Butler at Sal Austin’s brothel
- Marie-Jeanne – Prostitute

Ch 10

  - John Bright – British MP
  - William Gladstone – British PM
- Elizabeth Keckley – Dressmaker to Mrs. Lincoln
  - Nelson – Todd family butler in KY
  - Mammy Sally – Todd family nanny in KY
  - Judge Turner – Lexington judge
  - Caroline Turner – Cruel wife of Judge Tuner, slave murderer
  - Richard – Turner slave, murderer of Caroline in self defense

Ch 11

- Empress Eugenie – Last empress of France, wife of Napoleon III
  - Calvin Fairbanks – Abolitionist minister with slave buyback scheme
  - Eliza – Slave bought at auction by Fairbanks, freed in KY
  - Lord Lyons – British minister to USA
  - Benjamin Disraeli – British Chancellor of the Exchequer
- Caleb B. Smith – Lincoln’s Secretary of the Interior, from KY, conservative
  - Captain Fox – Union naval officer
- Frederick Seward – Seward’s son, Undersecretary of State

Ch 12

- General Beauregard – Confederate general in SC
  - Mrs. Alexander – Member of founding family of Alexandria, VA
  - Doctor Breckinridge – Former VP’s uncle, unionist in KY
  - Governor Pickens – Governor of SC
- Senator Hale – Senator from NH

Ch 13

- Mr. Mayberry – Alexandria tavernkeeper, Confederate information monger
- Mr. Brown – Mayor of Baltimore
  - Benjamin Butler – Union general, commander of 8th Massachusetts Regiment, commander at Ft Monroe
- Henry Wikoff – Diplomat, memoirist, the “Chevalier,” friend of Sickles and Mrs. Lincoln
  - Queen Isabella – Queen of Spain
- Napoleon III – Emperor of France
  - Joseph Bonaparte – Napoleon’s uncle
  - Lord Palmerston – British diplomat and intelligence agent
- Charles Schermerhorn Schuyler – Diplomat, author
  - Victor Hugo – French novelist
  - Larmatine – French politician
  - The Misses Mentelle – Sisters, mistresses of French academy in Lexington
- Emilie Helm – Mrs. Lincoln’s half sister, “Little Sister”
- Ben Hardin Helm – Mrs. Lincoln’s brother in law, West Pointer

Ch 15

- William Sprague – Governor of RI, the “boy governor”
- Ambrose Burnside – West Point grad, Union commander, former RR man with Lincoln
- Zach Chandler – Senator from MI
- Senator Hale – Senator from NH
- Bessie Hale – Senator Hale’s daughter, inamorata of John Wilkes Booth
  - Thaddeus Stevens – Congressman from PA, chair of Ways and Means Committee
- M. Mercier – French minister to US
- Baron Gerolt – Prussian minister to US
  - Governor Hardin – Governor of Kentucky
- Mr. Watt – White House groundsman
  - William S. Wood – Commissioner of Public Buildings

Ch 16

  - Mrs Cuthbert – White House housekeeper
- Mr Anderson – Virginia innkeeper, Marshall House

Ch 17

- Mr Stevens – President of New York Bank of Commerce
- Mr Vail – Cashier of New York Bank of Commerce
- Morris Ketchum – Independent banker
- William Henry Aspenwall – Independent banker
  - Mr Merryman – Prisoner of US Army in Baltimore, held without charge
  - General Cadwalder – Union leader at Ft McHenry

Ch 18

- Irvin McDowell – General, Union Army of the Potomac
  - General Mansfield – Union commander
  - General McClellan – Union commander
  - Charles Francis Adams – US minister to England
- John Bigelow – Former editor of NY Evening Post, US minister to France
  - General Johnston – Confederate commander at Harper’s Ferry
  - General Bates – Union commander
  - General Fremont – Union commander in West
- John Forney – Clerk of the Senate, editor of Washington Chronicle
  - William O. Stoddard – Mrs. Lincoln’s aide

Ch 19

- William Fessenden – Senator from ME, later Secretary of Treasury after Chase
- LymanTrumbull – Senator from IL
- William Howard Russell – Times of London war correspondent
- William Sanford – Union captain, General McClellan’s aide
  - Julia Trumbull – Senator Trumbull’s wife, former friend of Mrs Lincoln
  - James Gordon Bennett, Jr. – Bennett’s son

Ch 20

- Rose Greenhow – Great-niece of Dolly Madison, Aunt of Stephen Douglas, confederate informant
- Bettie Duvall – Confederate informant
  - Reverend Doctor James Smith – Presbyterian minister from Springfield, friend of Mrs Lincoln, proposed as US minister to Scotland
- Benjamin Wade – Senator from OH, radical abolitionist
- James Grimes – Senator from IA
- Henry Wilson – Senator from MA
  - George Washington – Headwaiter at Willard’s Hotel

Part 2 – Ch 1

  - Major French – Commissioner of Public Buildings
  - Alexander T. Stewart – NY department store magnate
  - Edward D. Baker – Former IL senator and friend of Lincoln
  - General Hunter – Union commander
  - General Henry E. Halleck – Union commander in West; protégé of Scott
  - Senator Johnson – Senator from TN, Unionist
  - Clausewitz – German political theorist
  - Judge Davis – Friend of Lincoln, appointed to the Supreme Court
- Baron Stueckl – Russian minister to US

Ch 2

  - Prince Albert – Husband of Queen Victoria
- Count of Paris – Prince, rightful king of France, visiting US
- Duke of Chartres – the prince’s brother
- Prince of Joinville – The prince’s uncle
- Emily Glendenning – Actress
- John T. Ford – Theater owner
- Chicken Henderson – Poultry Merchant, informant
- Zadoc Jenkins – Mrs. Surrat’s brother
  - Father Jenkins – President of St Charles College in MD
- Susan Henderson – Family friend of Chase
- Baron Schleiden – Hanseatic minister to US
  - Joseph Holt – Pro Union Democrat in Buchanan’s cabinet

Ch 3

- Mr. Wormley – Washington restaurateur
  - Joshua Speed – Lincoln’s old friend from IL
  - Mr. Hill – Store owner in IL, Lincoln’s old friend
- Dr. Prettyman – Brothel physician
  - Dr. Drake – Physician from Cincinnati
  - Mr. Chatterton – Herndon’s friend, office-seeker
  - General Buell – Union officer in west
  - General Franklin – Union officer
- F. E. Spinner – US Treasurer
- Mr. Meigs – Union quartermaster general

Ch 4

  - Mrs. Watt – John Watt’s wife, on the White House payroll as steward
  - Mr. Waterman – Rich man from NY
- John Hickman – Congressman from PA, abolitionist, Chair of joint congressional commission on the conduct of the war
- Mrs. Crittendon – Washington society lady
- Mrs. Welles – Wife of Congressman Welles
  - Ulysses S. Grant – Brigadier General from IL
  - Elizabeth Edwards – Mrs. Lincoln’s sister

Ch 5

- General Viele – Union commander
- Commodore Goldsborough – Union naval officer
- John E. Wool – Union commander at Ft Monroe
  - General Hooker – Union commander at Williamsburg

Ch 6

  - Joe Johnston – Confederate commander at Richmond
  - Therena Bates – Nicolay’s fiancée
  - Hole-in-the-Day – Native American leader
- General Pope – Union commander from IL; “Old Brains”
- James A. Garfield – Union general from OH, major-general at Chickamauga, later congressman
  - Lucretia Garfield – General Garfield’s wife
  - Mrs Laury – Spiritualist medium

Ch 7

- Azadia – prostitute
- E. M. Thomas – African American leader
  - Frederick Douglass – African American leader
  - Princess Alice – Daughter of Queen Victoria
  - Grand Duke of Hesse – Princess Alice’s betrothed
  - Adele Douglas – Widow of Stephen Douglas
- Harris Hoyt – Texas cotton merchant and would-be smuggler; colleague of Sprague
  - Mr Thayer – Potential governor of East Florida
  - Governor Dayton – Corrupt governor of OH
  - Fred Ives – RI journalist and speechwriter for Sprague
  - Byron Sprague – Industrialist, Sprague’s cousin
- Charles E Prescott – Shipfitter

Ch 8

  - James Trimble – White House steward
- Jimmy – White House maintenance man
  - Anna Miles – Herdon’s bride
  - James Stanton – Stanton’s infant son
  - Mr. Wadsworth – Republican candidate for Governor of NY
  - Horatio Seymore – Democratic Governor of NY
  - Andrew Johnson – Republican Governor of TN
  - William S. Rosenkrans – Union commander

Ch 9

- Charles Eames – Publisher, diplomat
- Mrs. Eames – Eames’s wife, fashionable hostess
- Baroness Gerolt – Gerolt’s wife
- Carlotta Gerolt – Gerolt’s daughter
  - M. Mercier – French diplomat
  - Otto von Bismarck – Prussian chancellor
  - Manton Marble – Editor of the New York World
- Mr. Sullivan – Saloon keeper, Confederate spy
  - ”The Colonel” – Head of Confederate intelligence in DC
  - Artemus Ward – Comic author
  - Preston King – Republican Senator from NY
  - Laurence Stern – English author
  - Jacob Collamer – Senator from VT

Ch 10

- Mrs. Stanton – Stanton’s wife
  - Mrs Caleb Smith – Smith’s wife
  - John Usher – Appointed Secretary of the Interior, from IN
  - Sam Todd – Mrs. Lincoln’s half brother, killed at Shiloh
  - Aleck Todd – Mrs. Lincoln’s half brother, killed at Baton Rouge, “Little Aleck”
  - Clement C. Valladigham – Congressman from OH, Democratic “copperhead”
- William O’Connor – Treasury Department clerk, novelist
  - Ralph Waldo Emerson – Poet
- Walt Whitman – Poet, appointment seeker
  - Mr. Taylor – NY saloonkeeper
  - George Whitman – Whitman’s brother, Union soldier
  - Mrs. Whitman – Whitman’s mother

Ch 11

- Corporal Stone – Confederate soldier, Mrs. Lincoln’s friend from KY
  - John Todd – Mrs. Lincoln’s cousin, Confederate general
  - John Hunt Morgan – Confederate commander from KY
  - Mrs. Todd – Mrs. Lincoln’s stepmother
  - Charles Hay – Hay’s brother
  - Fanny Sprague – Sprague’s mother, New England matriarch
- Roscoe Conkling – Congressman from NY

Ch 12

  - George Meade – Union general
  - Governor Curtin – Governor of PA
  - The Biddles – Patrician family of PA
  - Mrs. Pomroy – Mrs. Lincoln’s nurse
- Captain Rewalt – Union physician from PA
  - Mr. Chandler – War Department telegraph operator
  - Miss Hooper – Daughter of Georgetown merchant
  - P.T. Barnum – Impresario
  - Tom Thumb – Entertainer
  - Mrs. Thumb – Entertainer
- Admiral Porter – Union naval commander
  - Mrs. Hanks – Lincoln’s mother
  - John C. Calhoun – Slavery advocate
  - Senator Morgan – Senator from NY
- Samuel J. Tilden – Former governor of NY
  - Martin Van Buren – Former president
  - Archbishop Hughes – Catholic archbishop of NY

Part 3 – Ch 1

  - Mr. Grover – Theater owner
  - E. L. Davenport – Actor
  - J. W. Wallack – Actor
  - Miss Cushman – Actor
- Edward Spangler – Stagehand
  - Edwin Forrest – Actor
  - Junius Brutus Booth – Actor, father of John Wilkes Booth
  - Edwin Booth – Actor, brother of John Wilkes Booth
  - J.B. Booth, Jr. – Theater manager
  - Mrs. Siddons – Actor
  - Senator Pomeroy – Senator from KS, Chase’s campaign manager
- Whitelaw Reid – Journalist from Cincinnati Gazette
- Ella Turner – John Wilkes Booth’s date
  - F. W. Hurtt – Henry Cooke’s partner, owner of Ohio State Journal
  - Isaac J. Allen – Editor and partner in Ohio State Journal
- Hiram Barney – Customs collector, Port of New York
- General Magruder – Union commander in Galveston
  - William Wheatley – Actor

Ch 2

- Ira Harris – Senator from NY
  - Teresa Sickles – Sickles’s wife
  - Katherine Helm – Emilie’s daughter

Ch 3

  - Schuyler Colfax – Speaker of the House
  - James G. Blaine – Congressman from ME, newspaper editor
  - James A. Garfield – Congressman, Union major-general at Chickamauga
- John T. Trowbridge – Chase’s biographer
  - Senator Sherman – Senator and pamphleteer
  - Mr. Winchell – NY journalist and pamphleteer
  - Isaac Newton – Director of Agriculture Bureau
  - Simeon Draper – Collector, Port of New York
- Fred Grant – General Grant’s son
  - William Mortimer – Government appointee, friend of Mrs. Lincoln
  - William Tecumseh Sherman – Union general

Ch 4

  - James S. Wadsworth – Union general, friend of Lincoln
  - Governor Andrew – Governor of NY
  - Mr. Dickinson – NY politician
  - Emperor Maximillian – French ruler in Mexico
- Julia Ward Howe – Poet
  - John Burrows – Treasury Department clerk, literary man
- Maunsell B. Field – Chase’s aide and protégé
  - Baron Renfrew – Prince of Wales
  - Jenny Lind – Swedish soprano
  - John C. Cisco – Treasurer of NY
  - Senator Morgan – Senator from NY
  - Senator Chase – Senator from NY
  - Dave Tod – Governor of OH, nominated by Lincoln as Secretary of the Treasury
  - General Schenk – Union commander
- Mr. Hooper – Congressman, friend of Chase
- Senator Conness – Senator
- Louis XVI – King of France
- M. Necker – Louis’ finance minister

Ch 5

  - Jubal Early – Confederate general at Washington
  - Lew Wallace – Union general at Monocacy Junction
- Horatio Wright – Union major general at Washington
  - Abram Wakeman – Candidate for Surveyor of NY
  - A.T. Stewart – NY merchant
- Oliver Wendell Holmes, Jr. – Union lieutenant colonel, son of the poet

Ch 6

  - Philip Sheridan – Union general
  - Admiral Farragut – Union naval commander
- Mr. Nichols – Union soldier in Lincoln’s guard
- Mr. Raymond – Publisher of the New York Times

Ch 7

  - Petroleum V. Nasby – Comic author
- John A. Dix – Union commander of the Department of the East
  - William Dennison – Postmaster General after Blair
- Major Eckert – Union officer
- Noah Brooks – Journalist from CA, Lincoln’s second term secretary

Ch 8

  - Mr. Walsh – Druggist in Navy Yard, Washington
  - Mr. Lloyd – The Surrat’s tenant in MD
- Mr. and Mrs. Holohan – Surrat’s boarders in Washington
  - James Speed – Springfield attorney, brother of Joshua Speed, nominated for Attorney General
  - Charles S. Prescott – Smuggler
- William H. Reynolds – Smuggler

Ch 9

- Alexander H. Stevens – Confederate Vice President
- John A. Campbell – Former Supreme Court Justice, Confederate negotiator
- R.M.T. Hunter – Former Senator, Confederate negotiator
- Lewis Payne – Conspirator, aka Lewis Powell of Mosby’s Raiders, “The Terrible Lew”
- George Atzerodt – Boatman, smuggler, conspirator
  - Avonia Jones – Actress
- Major French – Director of Lincoln’s second inauguration
  - Hugh M. McCulloch – Secretary of Treasury after Fessenden

Ch 10

- Mr. Crook – Tad Lincoln’s bodyguard
- James Ord – Commanding General, Union Army of the James
- Mrs. Griffiths – Wife of Union general
- Mrs. Ord – Ord’s wife
- Major Seward – Seward’ nephew
- General Weitzer – Union officer at Richmond

Ch 11

- Laura Keene – Comic actress
- Miss Harris – Daughter of Senator Harris
- Major Rathbone – Miss Harris’s fiancé
- Isaac – Lincoln’s friend from Chicago
- Tom Pendel – White House doorkeeper
- Emma Schuyler – Daughter of Charles Schuyler, Princess d’Agrigent
  - Prince d’Agrigent – French aristocrat, Emma’s estranged husband

== Reception ==
The Washington Post wrote a positive review at the time of publication, praising Vidal’s well practiced craftsmanship in skilfully creating a satisfying read. This positive praise was reflected in The New York Review of Books.

In addition, the book was subject to critical backlash, primarily from academic historians. Roy P. Basler contends that much of Lincoln’s life never happened as told by Vidal. This historical inaccuracy extends to the character’s personalities and physical attributes. Significantly, Vidal faced intense criticism for his depiction of a racist Lincoln, and a syphilitic deranged Mary Todd Lincoln. Despite the novel’s genre of historical narrative, the purported distortion in facts was seen as potentially damaging to the public.

John Alvis published a review of the novel in The Claremont Review of Books. According to Alvis, the book is ‘disappointing for being at bottom inadequate.’ It was contended that Vidal’s novel succumbed to melodrama, historical inaccuracy and sensationalism. The Dean of Lincoln Scholars Richard N. Current took great exception to his novel, starting a running feud with Vidal in the pages of The New York Review of Books.

However, within academic quarters there was also positive reception. Harold Bloom, the Sterling Professor of Humanities at Yale University, published a review in The New York Review of Books, where he called the book ‘superb’ and ‘grand entertainment.’ Vidal was also described as an impressive writer who has helped shape popular consciousness and offer an alternative view on the dominant understanding of American society and history.

== Awards ==
In 1985 Vidal was awarded the Benjamin Barondess Award for the novel. The recipient of the award receives a sculpture of Abraham Lincoln, specifically a bust. It is presented annually "to any person or institution and for any contribution to the greater appreciation of the life and works of Abraham Lincoln as decided upon by the award committee.”

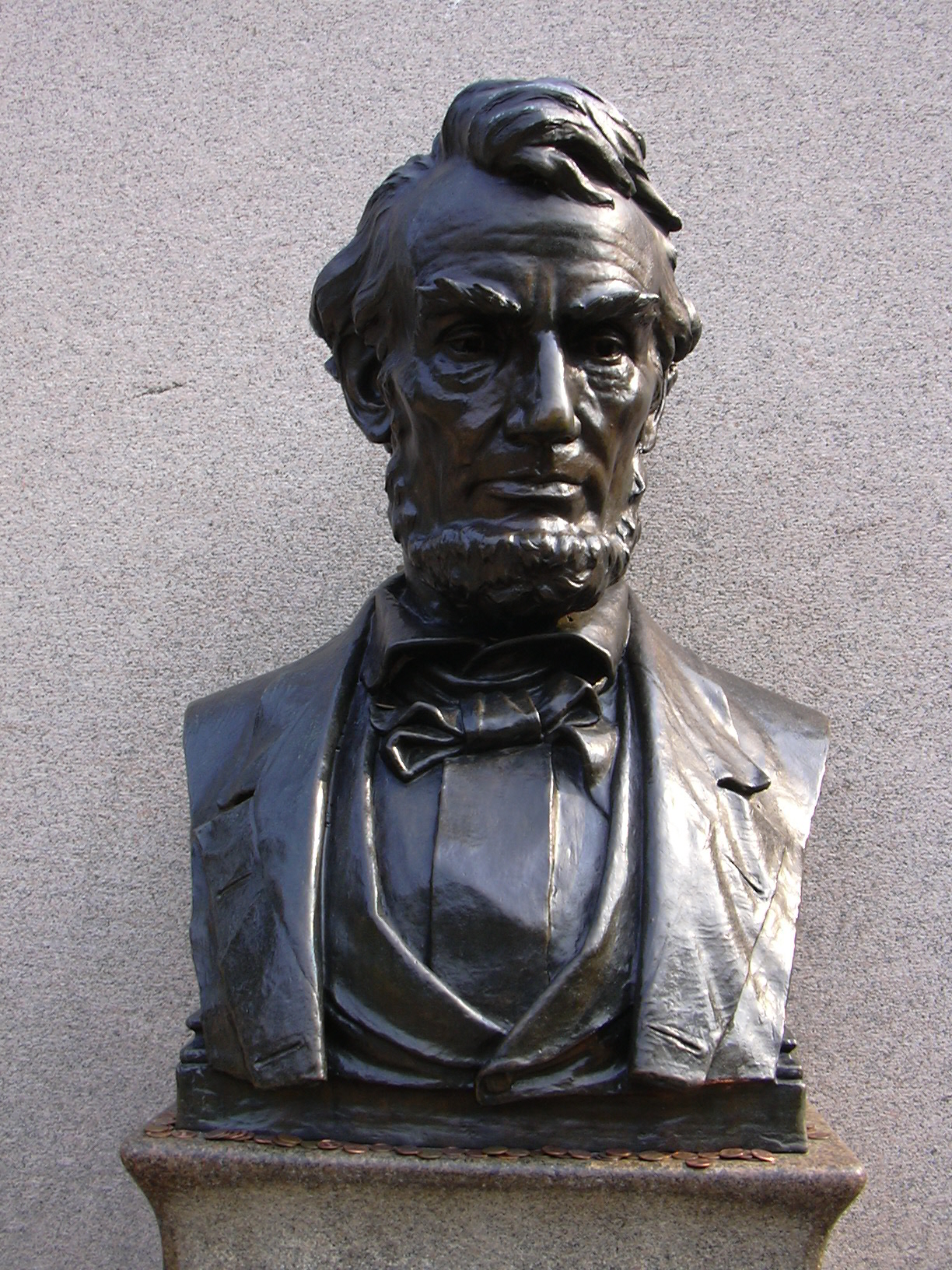
A bust of Abraham Lincoln

It also was placed on the Torchlight List that recognises 200 works that equip people with concepts to help them comprehend the complexities of the modern world. The list is definitive and was devised by Jim Flynn, a professor who lectures at the University of Otago.

It was also placed on the New York Times Best Seller List in 1984.

== Adaptation ==
Lincoln, a made-for-TV film based on the novel, first aired in 1988 in two parts on March 27 and March 28. It stars Sam Waterston as Lincoln and Mary Tyler Moore as Mary Todd Lincoln.

It differed from the book by focussing less on the personal struggle and growth of Lincoln, but more on the war itself. Both the director and lead actress were awarded Emmys for their work on the miniseries.

== Writing and publication ==
The book was published in 1984 by Penguin Random House LLC. Vidal claimed that the book was researched and written over a period of 5 years. It largely draws from primary sources, including newspapers, diaries, and letters of the time. Like Vidal's other historical fiction works, such as Washington D.C. and Burr: A Novel, Vidal includes an extraordinary amount of detail, and attempts to follow the documented record closely.

Vidal’s Lincoln was considered a commercial success. It was on The New York Times’ best-seller chart for 22 weeks and sold over 250 000 hard cover copies. The Afterword of the novel thanks Professor David Herbert Donald of Harvard’s History Department for fact checking the manuscript.
