= Duluth (novel) =

1983 novel by Gore Vidal

- Cover of the first edition
- Author: Gore Vidal
- Language: English
- Publisher: Random House
- Publication date: 1983
- Publication place: United States
- Media type: Print (Hardcover and Paperback)
- Pages: 214 pp (first edition hardcover)
- ISBN: 0-394-52738-0
- OCLC: 9155230
- Preceded by: Creation

Duluth is a 1983 novel by Gore Vidal. He considered it one of his best works, as did Italo Calvino, who wrote, "Vidal's development along that line, from Myra (Breckenridge) to Duluth, is crowned with great success, not only for the density of comic effects, each one filled with meaning, not only for the craftsmanship in construction, put together like a clock-work which fears no word processor, but because this latest book holds its own built-in theory, that which the author calls 'après-post-structuralism'. (...) I consider Vidal to be a master of that new form which is taking shape in world literature and which we may call the hyper-novel or the novel elevated to the square or the cube."

== Plot summary ==
One of the experimental texts Vidal refers to as his "inventions", Duluth describes both a novel written about Duluth (that, bordered on one side by Minneapolis and on the other by Michigan, bears scant resemblance to the real city) and a television series of the same name; when residents of the city die, they end up as characters in the TV show, who can in some cases continue interacting with the living through the TV screen. When members of the cast of Duluth, the TV show, die, they become characters in Rogue Duke, a romance novel serialized in the pages of Redbook, the popular women's magazine.

The author of all three, Rosemary Klein Kantor, is herself a character in the book, making cameo appearances throughout. She generates texts with the aid of a computer, adding to its numerous geographical and historical errors her mangled clichés ("Bellamy Craig II plays hardball...in the fast lane!") and unusual grammatical constructions ("Her handcuffs now handcuffed her hands"). However, there is in the city of Duluth a mysterious cerise flying saucer whose insectoid alien inhabitants, after meddling in the spectacularly corrupt politics of the city, use an accidental tense shift to seize control of the computer, erasing the human race from the face of the earth and bringing the book to an end.

== Reception ==
Kirkus Reviews called it "(l)eaden parody [and] hollow satire" with "a dozen or two good laughs amid the encroaching tedium", concluding that "this sort of in-crowd parody is better done in those New Yorker one-or-two-page humor pieces. In Vidal's extended version, the gag wears thin very fast." In The New York Times, George Stade declared that Vidal "is not at his best here", noting the "uncharacteristic lack of zest to his malice," and finding the novel "more footloose than funny". Howard Davies, writing in Literary Review, compared it to The Serial, but noted that Duluth "fails by a long shot to be as consistently amusing", and posited that it is intended as "a lisping satire on Dallas" — and that thus its humor value is reduced if readers are unfamiliar with Dallas. Ultimately, Davies assessed, "(t)he route from Washington DC to Duluth is downhill all the way.

In 2023, a writer for the Duluth News Tribune said that Duluth "traffics in racial and gender stereotypes that, while presented in a satirical context, are so wildly offensive" that he did not wish to "elevate" the novel by devoting an entire column to it, concluding that it "is largely forgotten, and I think that's for the best."
