= Williwaw (novel) =

1946 novel by Gore Vidal

- Cover of the first edition
- Author: Gore Vidal
- Language: English
- Publisher: E. P. Dutton
- Publication date: 1946
- Publication place: United States
- Media type: Print (Hardback and Paperback)
- Pages: 222
- ISBN: 0919948553

Williwaw is the debut novel of Gore Vidal, written when he was 19 and first mate of a U.S. Army supply ship stationed in the Aleutian Islands during World War II. The story combines war drama, maritime adventure and a murder plot. The book was first published in 1946 in the United States by E. P. Dutton. Williwaw is the term, widely thought to be Native American in origin, for a sudden, violent Katabatic wind common to the Aleutian Islands.

== Plot summary ==
The story is set on a U.S. ship in the Arctic waters around the Aleutians in the Pacific Ocean in the middle of the local storm season during World War II. The nervousness and tension of the crew and a handful of passengers at the approach of the williwaw is stretched to breaking point when the Chief Engineer, Duval, falls overboard in suspicious circumstances.
