= Narratives of Empire =

Series of historical novels of America by Gore Vidal

- Burr (1973); Lincoln (1984); 1876 (1976); Empire (1987); Hollywood (1990); Washington, D.C. (1967); The Golden Age (2000)
- Author: Gore Vidal
- Genre: Historical fiction
- Publisher: Random House
- Published: 1967–2000
- No. of books: 7

The Narratives of Empire series is a heptalogy of historical novels by American writer Gore Vidal, published between 1967 and 2000, that chronicle the dawn-to-decadence history of the "American Empire"; the narratives weave the stories of two families with the personages and events of U.S. history. Despite the publisher's preference for the politically neutral series-title "American Chronicles", Vidal preferred the series title "Narratives of Empire". The seven novels can be read in either historical or publication order without losing narrative intelligibility.

== Books ==
=== Burr (1973) ===
Though Burr (1973) is the second book published in the series, it is first chronologically, taking place in 1775–1808, 1833–1836, and 1840. In the novel, set during the politically contentious era of the Jackson administration, an elderly and active Aaron Burr recounts his experiences of the Revolutionary War and America's Founding Fathers to a young law clerk secretly working for the press.

The novel includes Aaron Burr, George Washington, Thomas Jefferson, Alexander Hamilton, John Adams, Dolley Madison, James Monroe, Alexander McDougall, Davy Crockett, Martin Van Buren, Andrew Jackson, William Leggett, Helen Jewett, William Cullen Bryant, Samuel Swartwout, Jane McManus Storm, Edwin Forrest, and Washington Irving. Fictional characters include Charlie Schuyler, Carolina de Traxler, and William de la Touche Clancey.

=== Lincoln (1984) ===
Though published fourth, Lincoln (1984) is the second book in the series chronologically, taking place in 1861–1865, and 1867. In the novel, members of President Abraham Lincoln's government and household help to carry out his policy of preserving the Union through a dreadful and bloody civil war.

The novel includes Abraham Lincoln, John Hay, John Nicolay, Elihu Washburne, Mary Todd Lincoln, William Seward, Salmon P. Chase, David Herold, Mary Surratt, John Wilkes Booth, Kate Chase, and William Sprague. Fictional characters include William Sanford, Charlie Schuyler, Emma Schuyler d'Agrigente, and William de la Touche Clancey.

=== 1876 (1976) ===
1876 (1976) is the third novel in the series, taking place from 1875–1877. In the novel, after 40 years abroad, an American writer returns to the US during the Reconstruction Era to find New York and Washington transformed by recession, extreme wealth and political corruption, all culminating in the theft of the 1876 United States presidential election.

The novel includes Samuel J. Tilden, Rutherford B. Hayes, James G. Blaine, Roscoe Conkling, James A. Garfield, Mark Twain, James Gordon Bennett, Jr., Madame Restell, and Ward McAllister. Fictional characters include Charlie Schuyler, Emma Schuyler d'Agrigente, John Day Apgar, William Sanford, Denise Delacroix Sanford, and William de la Touche Clancey.

=== Empire (1987) ===
Though published fifth, Empire (1987) is the fourth book in the series chronologically, taking place from 1898–1907. In the novel, a circle of political intellectuals and enterprising newspaper editors learn of the power they wield as they push for and chronicle the growth of the American Empire at the turn of the 20th century.

The novel includes John Hay, William Randolph Hearst, William McKinley, Theodore Roosevelt, George Dewey, William Jennings Bryan, Elihu Root, Henry Adams, and Henry James. Fictional characters include Caroline Sanford, Blaise Sanford, James Burden Day, John Apgar Sanford, and Mrs. Delacroix.

=== Hollywood (1990) ===
Though published sixth, Hollywood (1990) is the fifth book in the series chronologically, taking place from 1917–1923. The novel is from the perspectives of film makers, news publishers and political operatives as a burgeoning and experimental motion picture industry in Los Angeles (taken over as the propaganda arm of an authoritarian presidential administration) rises to wealth and international prominence in the First World War; all resulting in a political backlash of isolationism, prohibition, censorship and a second-rate presidency.

The novel includes Woodrow Wilson, Warren G. Harding, Jess Smith, George Creel, Franklin D. Roosevelt, Eleanor Roosevelt, Charlie Chaplin, Marion Davies, Elinor Glyn, Mabel Normand, and William Desmond Taylor. Fictional characters include Caroline Sanford, Blaise Sanford, and James Burden Day.

=== Washington, D.C. (1967) ===
Though published first, Washington, D.C. (1967) is the sixth book in the series chronologically, taking place from 1937–1954. This is a story of political life in Washington among congressmen, the press and the social elites during the administrations of Franklin D. Roosevelt, Harry S. Truman and Dwight D. Eisenhower. Fictional characters include Blaise Sanford, Peter Sanford, James Burden Day, and Clay Overbury.

=== The Golden Age (2000) ===
The Golden Age (2000) is the seventh and final book in the series and takes place from 1939–1954 and in the year 2000. In the novel, the US is maneuvered into the Second World War by President Roosevelt, whose successors pursue a fatal Cold War policy of military and economic domination just as the nation has become the center of western art and culture.

The novel includes Franklin D. Roosevelt, Eleanor Roosevelt, Harry Hopkins, Harry S. Truman, Wendell Willkie, Dean Acheson, Herbert Hoover, Gore Vidal, John La Touche, Dawn Powell, and Tennessee Williams. Fictional characters include Caroline Sanford, Blaise Sanford, Peter Sanford, James Burden Day, and Clay Overbury.
