= 1876 (novel) =

1976 novel by Gore Vidal

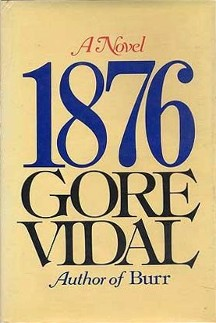
- Cover of the first edition
- Author: Gore Vidal
- Language: English
- Series: Narratives of Empire
- Genre: Historical novel
- Publisher: Random House
- Publication date: 1976
- Publication place: United States
- Media type: Print (Hardback & Paperback)
- Pages: 364 pp
- ISBN: 0-394-49750-3
- OCLC: 1859740
- Dewey Decimal: 813/.5/4
- LC Class: PS3543.I26 A6214 1976
- Preceded by: Lincoln
- Followed by: Empire

1876 is the third historical novel in Gore Vidal's Narratives of Empire series. It was published in 1976 and details the events of a year described by Vidal as "probably the low point in our republic's history".

== Style ==
The novel is written in the form of a journal written by Charles Schermerhorn Schuyler.

== Plot ==
The novel follows Charles Schermerhorn Schuyler who has recently returned to the United States after more than 30 years in Europe, where he married into minor Napoleonic nobility; he is accompanied by his beautiful, young, widowed daughter Emma, the Princesse d'Agrigente. She immediately becomes the darling of New York high society. Despite his fame and affluent image, Schuyler finds work as a journalist because his wealth has been destroyed by the Panic of 1873 and his daughter's late husband has left her penniless. Schuyler also supports the Democratic candidate, Samuel J. Tilden, Governor of New York, because he hopes to secure himself a diplomatic position with the incoming administration, enabling him to return to Europe.

The early chapters detail the Schuylers' introduction into New York society and the engagement between Emma and John Day Apgar, a wealthy but rather dull young lawyer and scion of a leading New York family. The later chapters chronicle Schuyler's sojourn in Washington, D.C., and Emma's growing friendship with the wealthy Denise Sanford and her boorish husband William. Emma and Denise become close friends, but after Denise dies in childbirth, Emma breaks off her engagement to Apgar and marries Sanford instead.

The political backdrop to the story is the 1876 presidential election, a close contest between Tilden and the Republican Rutherford B. Hayes. Tilden won the popular vote, but there was a dispute over the results in Louisiana, Oregon, South Carolina, and Florida. In Florida, the Republican leaders of the State and the Electoral Commission initially reported a victory for Tilden, before deciding that in fact Hayes had won. Vidal builds up to this historic crisis through the activities of a mixed cast of historical and fictional characters, some of the latter having appeared in Burr or having descended from characters in that novel.
