= Hollywood (Vidal novel) =

1990 novel by Gore Vidal

- Cover of the first edition
- Author: Gore Vidal
- Language: English
- Series: Narratives of Empire
- Genre: Historical novel
- Publisher: Random House
- Publication date: 1990
- Publication place: United States
- Media type: Print (hardback and paperback)
- Pages: 448
- ISBN: 0-375-70875-8
- OCLC: 50253286
- LC Class: PS3543.I26 H65 2000
- Preceded by: Empire
- Followed by: Washington, D.C.

Hollywood is the fifth historical novel in Gore Vidal's Narratives of Empire series. Published in 1990, it brings back the fictional Caroline Sanford, Blaise Sanford and James Burden Day and the real Theodore Roosevelt and William Randolph Hearst from Empire (the fourth novel in the series). Events are seen through the eyes of the Sanfords, Day, and the historical Jess Smith, a member of the Ohio Gang.

Historical characters introduced in this novel include Woodrow Wilson, Franklin D. Roosevelt, Eleanor Roosevelt and Warren G. Harding, as well early Hollywood figures such as Charlie Chaplin, Marion Davies, Elinor Glyn, Mabel Normand, and William Desmond Taylor, whose 1922 murder Vidal presents in fictionalized form.

In the novel, Hearst and Caroline separately enter the movie business. Caroline becomes both a producer and using a pseudonym performs as an actress. All this takes place while Wilson takes the United States into World War I and battles over the League of Nations and Harding's subsequent attempts to return the country to "normalcy".
