= The Smithsonian Institution (novel) =

1998 novel by Gore Vidal

- Cover of the first edition
- Author: Gore Vidal
- Language: English
- Publisher: Little, Brown
- Publication date: October 15, 1998
- Publication place: United States
- Media type: Print (Hardback & Paperback)
- Pages: 272 p.
- ISBN: 0-316-64504-4
- OCLC: 60211198

The Smithsonian Institution is an alternate history novel by Gore Vidal, first published in 1998.

The novel is a fictional account of the adventures of "T." as he helps a group of scientists in the basement of the Smithsonian create the neutron bomb, and encounters historical figures such as President Abraham Lincoln, Charles Lindbergh, Eleanor Roosevelt and Mrs. Grover Cleveland.

Reviewer Merle Rubin advises readers to "skip this" Vidal novel and "spend more profitable time rediscovering the many and varied pleasures of his earlier novels".
