= Gore Vidal =

American writer (1925–2012)

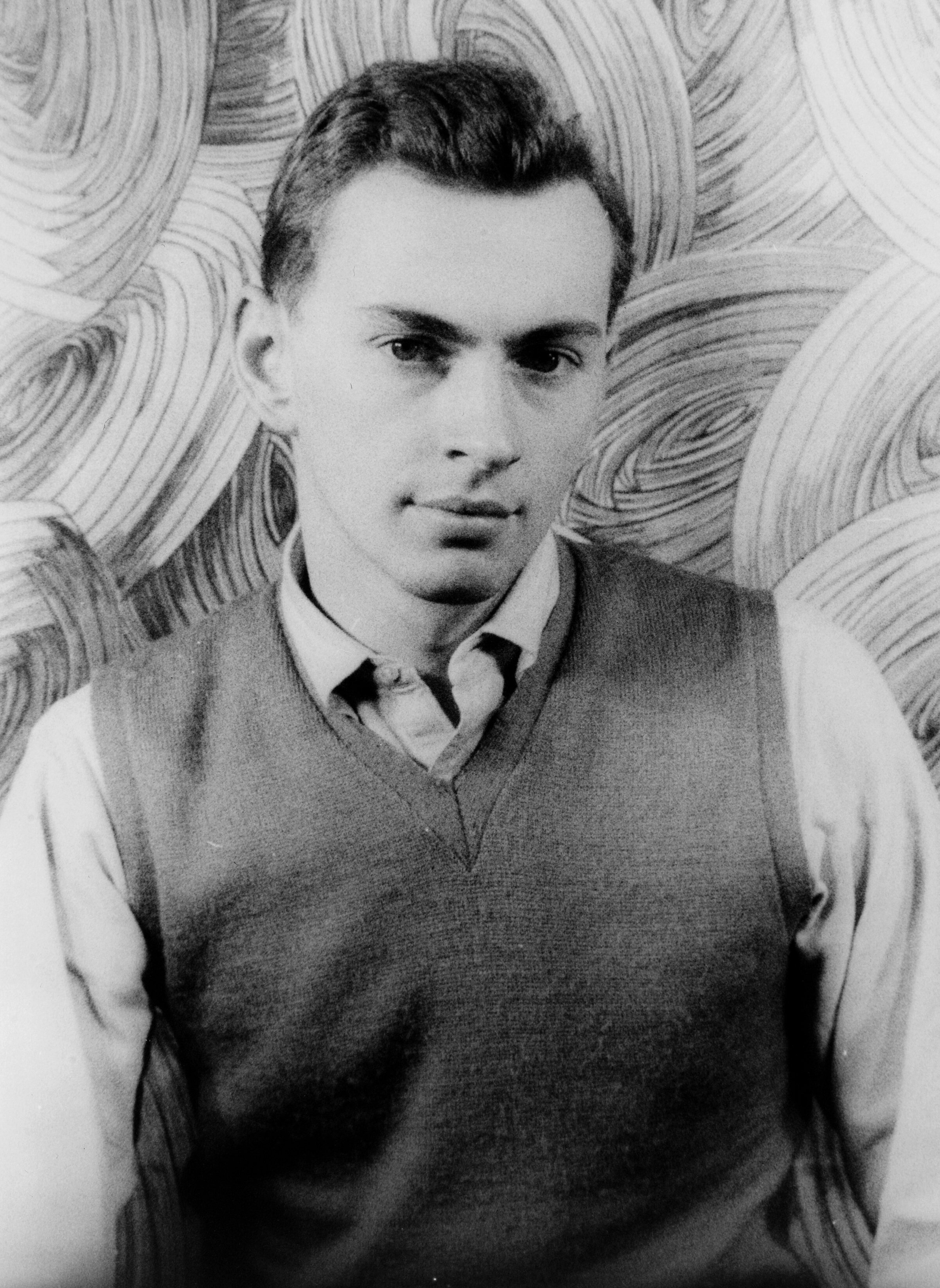
- Vidal in 1948
- Born: Eugene Louis Vidal; October 3, 1925; West Point, New York, U.S.
- Died: July 31, 2012 (aged 86); Los Angeles, California, U.S.
- Resting place: Rock Creek Cemetery
- Other name: Eugene Luther Vidal Jr.
- Occupations: Writer; novelist; essayist; playwright; screenwriter; actor
- Known for: The City and the Pillar (1948); Julian (1964); Myra Breckinridge (1968); Burr (1973); Lincoln (1984)
- Political party: Democratic; People's (affiliated non-member)
- Movement: Postmodernism
- Partners: See list: Anaïs Nin (1944–1948); Diana Lynn (1949–1950); Joanne Woodward (1950–1951); Howard Austen (1950–2003)
- Parents: Eugene Luther Vidal; Nina S. Gore
- Relatives: See list: Thomas Gore (grandfather); Nina Auchincloss (half-sister); Hugh Steers (half-nephew); Burr Steers (half-nephew)

Chair of the People's Party
- In office November 27, 1970 – November 7, 1972
- Military career
- Branch: United States Army
- Service years: 1943–1946
- Rank: Warrant officer
- Conflicts: World War II

Eugene Luther Gore Vidal (/vɪˈdɑːl/ vih-DAHL; born Eugene Louis Vidal, October 3, 1925 – July 31, 2012) was an American writer and public intellectual known for his cynical epigrammatic wit. His novels and essays criticized the social and sexual norms he perceived as driving American life. Vidal was heavily involved in politics, and unsuccessfully sought office twice as a Democratic Party candidate, first in 1960 to the United States House of Representatives (for New York), and later in 1982 to the United States Senate (for California).

A grandson of U.S. Senator Thomas Gore, Vidal was born into an upper-class political family. His political and cultural essays were published in The Nation, the New Statesman, the New York Review of Books, and Esquire magazines. As a public intellectual, Vidal's topical debates on sex, politics, and religion with other intellectuals and writers occasionally turned into quarrels with the likes of William F. Buckley Jr. and Norman Mailer.

As a novelist, Vidal explored the nature of corruption in public and private life. His style of narration evoked the time and place of his stories and delineated his characters' psychology. His third novel, The City and the Pillar (1948), about a dispassionately presented male homosexual relationship, offended conservative book reviewers' literary, political, and moral sensibilities.

Vidal's historical novel Julian (1964) recreates the world of Julian the Apostate (r. AD 361–363), the Roman emperor who attempted to reestablish Roman polytheism to counter Christianity. Myra Breckinridge (1968) is a social satire that explores the mutability of gender roles and sexual orientation as social constructs established by social mores. In Burr (1973) and Lincoln (1984), both part of his Narratives of Empire series of novels, each protagonist is presented as "A Man of the People" and as "A Man" in a narrative exploration of how the public and private facets of personality affect U.S. politics.

== Early life ==
Vidal was born in the cadet hospital of the U.S. Military Academy at West Point, New York, the only child of Eugene Luther Vidal (1895–1969) and Nina S. Gore (1903–1978). Vidal was born there because his father, a U.S. Army officer, was then serving as the first aeronautics instructor at the military academy. The middle name, Louis, was a mistake on the part of his father, "who could not remember, for certain, whether his own name was Eugene Louis or Eugene Luther". In his memoir Palimpsest (1995), Vidal wrote, "My birth certificate says 'Eugene Louis Vidal': this was changed to Eugene Luther Vidal Jr.; then Gore was added at my christening in 1939; then, at fourteen, I got rid of the first two names."

Vidal was baptized in January 1939, when he was 13 years old, by the headmaster of St. Albans School, where Vidal attended preparatory school. The baptismal ceremony was effected so he "could be confirmed [into the Episcopal faith]" at the Washington Cathedral, in February 1939, as "Eugene Luther Gore Vidal". He later said that, although the surname "Gore" was added to his names at the time of the baptism, "I wasn't named for him [maternal grandfather Thomas Pryor Gore], although he had a great influence on my life." In 1941, Vidal dropped his two first names, because he "wanted a sharp, distinctive name, appropriate for an aspiring author, or a national political leader ... I wasn't going to write as 'Gene' since there was already one. I didn't want to use the 'Jr.'"

His father, Eugene Luther Vidal Sr., was director (1933–1937) of the Commerce Department's Bureau of Air Commerce during the Roosevelt Administration and the great love of the aviator Amelia Earhart. At the U.S. Military Academy, Vidal Sr. had been a quarterback, coach, and captain of the football team and an all-American basketball player. He competed in the 1920 Summer Olympics and the 1924 Summer Olympics (seventh in the decathlon, and coach of the U.S. pentathlon). In the 1920s and the 1930s, Vidal Sr. was a founder or executive of three airline companies: the Ludington Line (later Eastern Airlines), Transcontinental Air Transport (later Trans World Airlines), and Northeast Airlines.

Gore's great-grandfather Eugen Fidel Vidal was born in Feldkirch, Austria, of Romansh background, and came to the U.S. with Gore's Swiss great-grandmother, Emma Hartmann.

Vidal's mother, Nina Gore, was a socialite who made her Broadway theater debut as an extra actress in Sign of the Leopard, in 1928. In 1922, Nina married Eugene Luther Vidal Sr. They divorced in 1935. Nina Gore Vidal married two more times, to Hugh D. Auchincloss and to Robert Olds. She also had "a long off-and-on affair" with the actor Clark Gable. As Nina Gore Auchincloss, Vidal's mother was an alternate delegate to the 1940 Democratic National Convention.

The subsequent marriages of his mother and father yielded four half-siblings for Gore Vidal—Vance Vidal, Valerie Vidal, Thomas Gore Auchincloss, and Nina Gore Auchincloss—one stepbrother, Hugh D. "Yusha" Auchincloss III from his mother's marriage to Hugh D. Auchincloss, and four stepbrothers, including Robin Olds, from her marriage to Robert Olds, a major general in the United States Army Air Forces (USAAF), who died in 1943, 10 months after marrying Nina. Through Auchincloss, Vidal also was the stepbrother once removed of Jacqueline Kennedy. Vidal's nephews include Burr Steers, a writer and film director, and Hugh Auchincloss Steers (1963–1995), a figurative painter.

Raised in Washington, D.C., Vidal attended the Sidwell Friends School and St. Albans School. His maternal grandfather, Senator Thomas Pryor Gore, was blind, and Vidal read aloud to him and was his Senate page and seeing-eye guide. In 1939, during his summer holiday, Vidal went with some colleagues and a professor from St. Albans School on his first European trip, to Italy and France. He visited Rome, the city that came to be "at the center of Gore's literary imagination", and Paris. When the Second World War began in early September, the group was forced to return home early. On his way back, he and his colleagues stopped in Great Britain, where they met the U.S. Ambassador to Great Britain, Joe Kennedy (the father of President John F. Kennedy). In 1940, Vidal attended the Los Alamos Ranch School. He later transferred to Phillips Exeter Academy, where he contributed to The Exonian, the school newspaper.

Vidal in his U.S. Army uniform, 1942

Rather than attend university, Vidal enlisted in the U.S. Army at age 17 and was assigned to work as an office clerk in the USAAF. Later, Vidal passed the examinations necessary to become a maritime warrant officer (junior grade) in the Transportation Corps and served as first mate of the F.S. 35th, a US Army Freight and Supply (FS) ship berthed at Dutch Harbor in the Aleutian Islands. After three years' service, Vidal suffered hypothermia, developed rheumatoid arthritis, and was reassigned to duty as a mess officer.

== Literary career ==
Vidal described his literary style as "knowing who you are, what you want to say, and not giving a damn." The cultural critic Harold Bloom wrote that Vidal believed his sexuality had denied him full recognition from the U.S. literary community. Bloom contended that Vidal's limited recognition was more because his "best fictions" were historical novels, a subgenre "no longer available for canonization".

=== Fiction ===
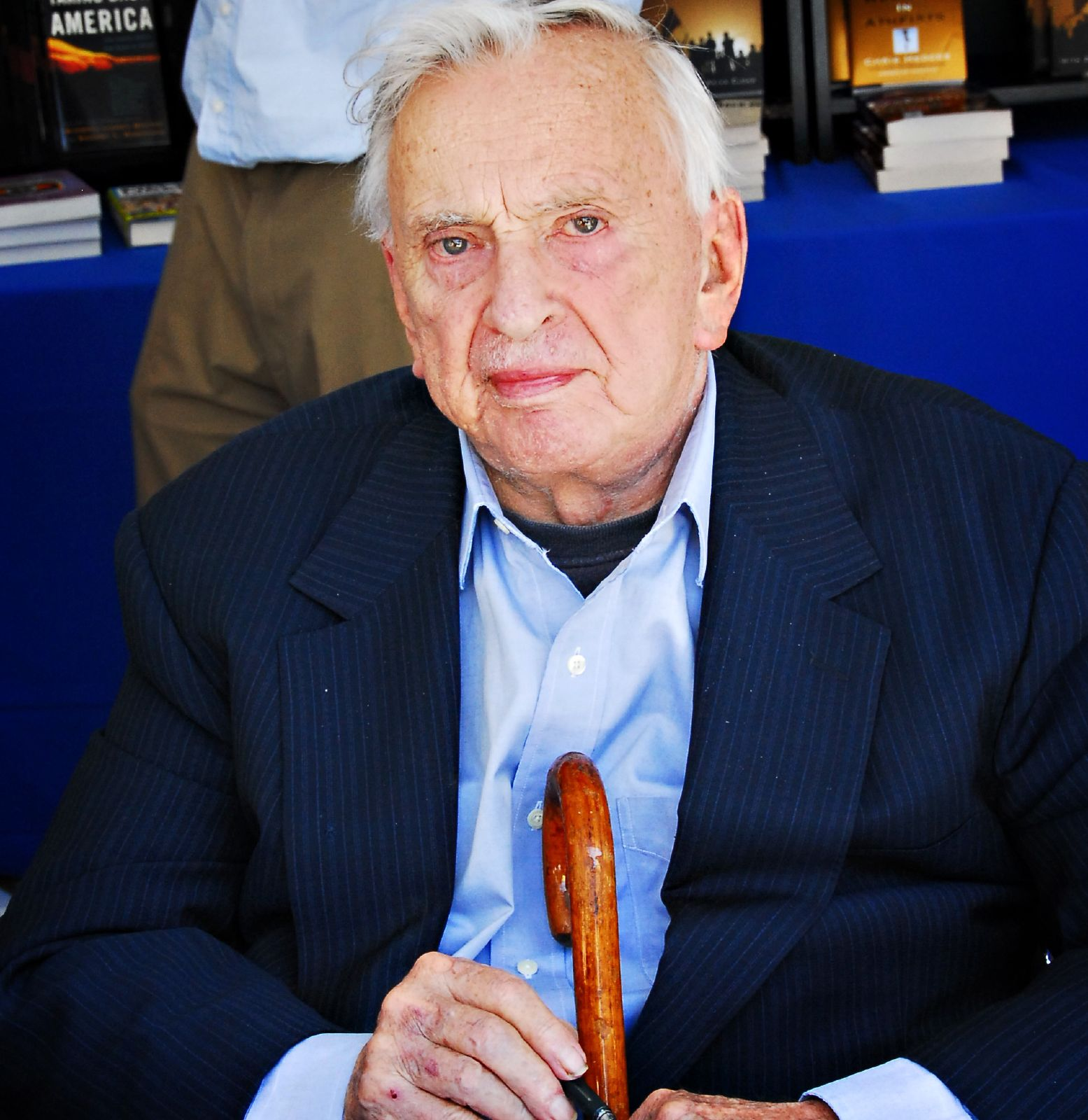
Vidal at the Los Angeles Times Festival of Books, 2008

Vidal's literary career began with the success of the military novel Williwaw, a men-at-war story derived from his Alaskan Harbor Detachment duty during World War II. His third novel, The City and the Pillar (1948), caused a moralistic furor over his dispassionate presentation of a young protagonist coming to terms with his homosexuality. The novel was dedicated to "J. T."; decades later, Vidal confirmed that the initials were those of his boyhood friend and St. Albans classmate James Trimble III, who was killed in the Battle of Iwo Jima on March 1, 1945, and was the only person Vidal ever loved. Critics railed against Vidal's presentation of homosexuality in the novel, as it was viewed generally at the time as unnatural and immoral. Vidal said that New York Times critic Orville Prescott was so offended by the book that he refused to review or to permit other critics to review any book by Vidal. Vidal said that, upon the book's publication, an editor at E. P. Dutton told him, "You will never be forgiven for this book. Twenty years from now, you will still be attacked for it." Today, Vidal is often seen as an early champion of sexual liberation.

Under the pseudonym "Edgar Box", Vidal wrote the mystery novels Death in the Fifth Position (1952), Death before Bedtime (1953), and Death Likes it Hot (1954), featuring Peter Cutler Sargeant II, a publicist turned private eye. His satirical novel Messiah, detailing the rise of a new nontheistic religion that comes to largely replace the Abrahamic faiths, was also published in 1954. The Edgar Box genre novels sold well and earned the blacklisted Vidal a secret living. That success led Vidal to write in other genres, including the stage play The Best Man: A Play about Politics (1960) and the television play Visit to a Small Planet (1957). Two early teleplays were A Sense of Justice (1955) and Honor. He also wrote the pulp novel Thieves Fall Out under the pseudonym Cameron Kay but refused to have it reprinted under his real name.

In the 1960s, Vidal published Julian (1964), about the Roman Emperor Julian the Apostate (r. A.D. 361–363), who sought to reinstate polytheistic paganism when he saw Christianity as a threat to the cultural integrity of the Roman Empire; Washington, D.C. (1967), about political life during Franklin D. Roosevelt's presidency (1933–1945); and Myra Breckinridge (1968), a satire of the American movie business by way of a school of dramatic arts owned by a transsexual woman, the eponymous anti-heroine.

After publishing the plays Weekend (1968) and An Evening With Richard Nixon (1972) and the novel Two Sisters: A Novel in the Form of a Memoir (1970), Vidal concentrated on essays and developed two types of fiction. The first is about American history, novels specifically about the nature of national politics. The New York Times, quoting critic Harold Bloom about those historical novels, said that "Vidal's imagination of American politics is so powerful as to compel awe." The historical novels formed the seven-book series Narratives of Empire: (i) Burr (1973), (ii) Lincoln (1984), (iii) 1876 (1976), (iv) Empire (1987), (v) Hollywood (1990), (vi) Washington, D.C. (1967), and (vii) The Golden Age (2000). Besides U.S. history, Vidal also explored and analyzed the history of the ancient world, specifically the Axial Age (800–200 B.C.), in the novel Creation (1981). It was published without four chapters that were part of the manuscript he submitted to the publisher; Vidal restored the chapters and republished Creation in 2002.

The second type of fiction is the topical satire, such as Myron (1974), the sequel to Myra Breckinridge; Kalki (1978), about the end of the world and the consequent ennui; Duluth (1983), an alternate universe story; Live from Golgotha (1992), about the adventures of Timothy, Bishop of Ephesus, in the early days of Christianity; and The Smithsonian Institution (1998), a time-travel story.

=== Nonfiction ===
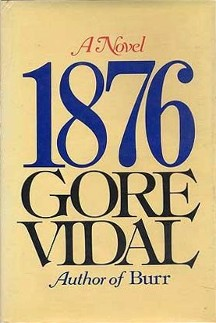
Vidal's historical novel 1876 (1976)

In the U.S., Vidal is often considered an essayist rather than a novelist. Even the occasionally hostile literary critic, such as Martin Amis, wrote, "Essays are what he is good at ... [Vidal] is learned, funny, and exceptionally clear-sighted. Even his blind spots are illuminating." He often wrote literary critical essays on contemporary literature. In a 1976 overview of postmodern fiction published in The New York Review of Books, Vidal criticized what he called the "University Novel", contrasting novels written to be read with those "written to be taught." He partly blamed the rise of the "University Novel"—represented by the likes of Thomas Pynchon, William H. Gass, and others—on the French critic Roland Barthes. As the literary scholar Ben Libman has argued, Vidal associated Barthes with the Nouveau roman in France and, in the U.S., with Susan Sontag, to whose literary sensibilities he was opposed.

For six decades, Vidal applied himself to sociopolitical, sexual, historical, and literary subjects. In the essay anthology Armageddon (1987) he explored the intricacies of power (political and cultural) in the contemporary United States. His criticism of the incumbent president, Ronald Reagan, as a "triumph of the embalmer's art" communicated that Reagan's provincial worldview, and his administration's, was out of date and inadequate to the geopolitical realities of the late 20th century. In 1993, Vidal won the National Book Award for Nonfiction for the anthology United States: Essays 1952–92 (1993).

In 2000, Vidal published the collection of essays The Last Empire, then such self-described "pamphlets" as Perpetual War for Perpetual Peace, Dreaming War: Blood for Oil and the Cheney-Bush Junta and Imperial America, critiques of American expansionism, the military–industrial complex, the national security state and the George W. Bush administration. Vidal also wrote a historical essay about the Founding Fathers, Inventing a Nation. In 1995, he published a memoir, Palimpsest, and in 2006 its follow-up volume, Point to Point Navigation. Earlier that year, Vidal had published Clouds and Eclipses: The Collected Short Stories.

In 2009, Vidal won the Medal for Distinguished Contribution to American Letters from the National Book Foundation, which called him a "prominent social critic on politics, history, literature and culture". The same year, the Man of Letters Gore Vidal was named honorary president of the American Humanist Association.

=== Hollywood ===
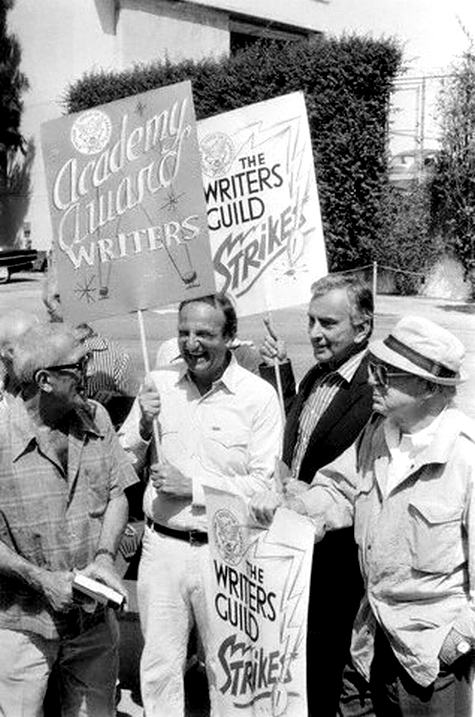
Vidal (second from right) supporting the 1981 Writers Guild of America strike

In 1956, MGM hired Vidal as a screenwriter with a four-year employment contract. In 1958, the director William Wyler required a script doctor to rewrite the screenplay for Ben-Hur (1959), originally written by Karl Tunberg. As one of several script doctors assigned to the project, Vidal rewrote significant portions of the script to resolve ambiguities of character motivation, specifically to clarify the enmity between the Jewish protagonist, Judah Ben-Hur, and the Roman antagonist, Messala, who had been close boyhood friends. In exchange for rewriting Ben-Hur, Vidal, on location in Italy, negotiated the early termination (at the two-year mark) of his MGM contract.

In the 1995 documentary film The Celluloid Closet, Vidal explained that Messala's failed attempt at resuming their homosexual, boyhood relationship motivated the ostensibly political enmity between Ben-Hur (Charlton Heston) and Messala (Stephen Boyd). Vidal said that Boyd was aware of the scene's homosexual subtext and that the director, the producer, and the screenwriter agreed to keep Heston ignorant of it, lest he refuse to play the scene. In turn, on learning of that explanation, Heston said that Vidal had contributed little to Ben-Hur. Despite Vidal's resolution of the character's motivations, the Screen Writers Guild assigned formal screenwriter credit to Karl Tunberg, in accordance with the WGA screenwriting credit system, which favored the "original author" of a screenplay rather than the writer of the filmed screenplay.

Two plays, The Best Man: A Play about Politics (1960, made into a film in 1964) and Visit to a Small Planet (1955), were theater and movie successes. Vidal occasionally returned to the movie business, and wrote historically accurate teleplays and screenplays about subjects important to him, such as Billy the Kid (1989), about William H. Bonney, a gunman in the New Mexico territory Lincoln County War and later an outlaw in the U.S. Western frontier, and 1979's Caligula (based upon the life of the Roman Emperor Caligula), from which Vidal had his screenwriter credit removed because the producer, Bob Guccione, the director, Tinto Brass, and the leading actor, Malcolm McDowell, added sex and violence to the script to increase its commercial appeal.

In the 1960s, Vidal migrated to Italy, where he befriended the film director Federico Fellini, for whom he appeared in a cameo role in the film Roma (1972). He also appeared in the American television series Mary Hartman, Mary Hartman and in the films Bob Roberts (1992), a serio-comedy about a reactionary populist politician who manipulates youth culture to win votes; With Honors (1994), an Ivy league comedy-drama; Gattaca (1997), a science-fiction drama about genetic engineering; and Igby Goes Down (2002), a coming-of-age serio-comedy directed by his nephew Burr Steers.

== Politics ==
=== Political campaigns ===
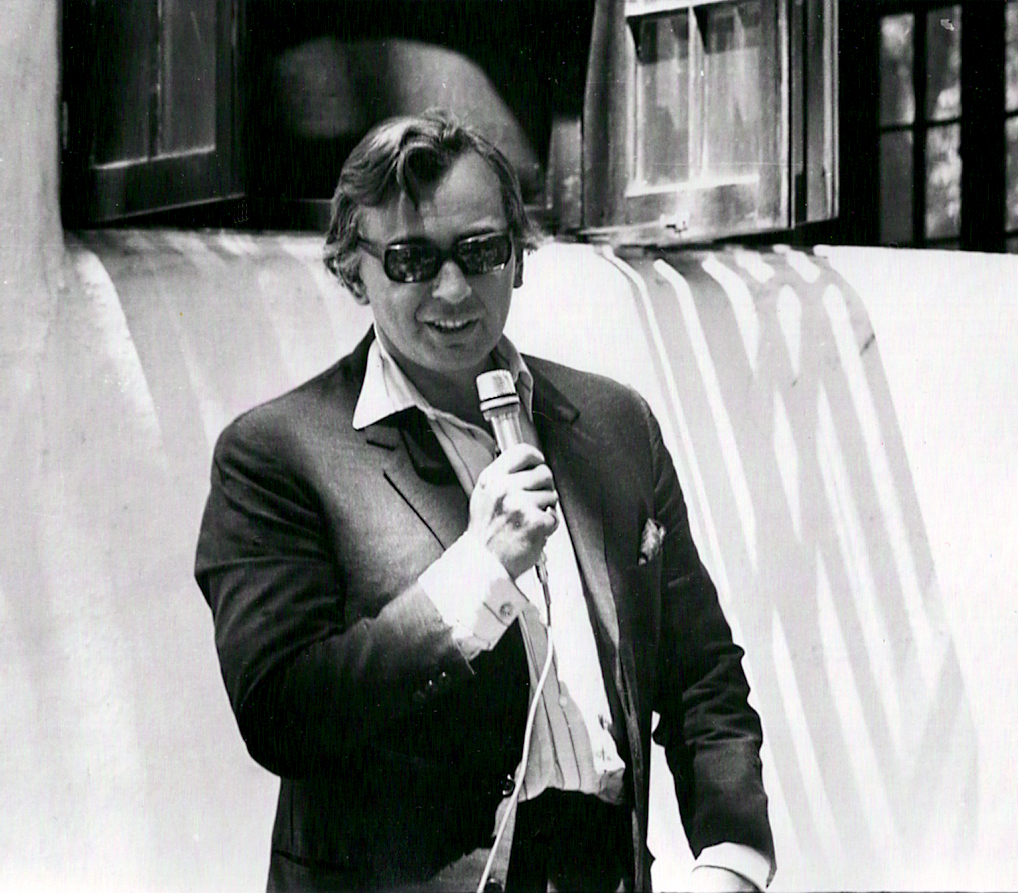
Vidal speaking for the People's Party in 1972

Vidal began to drift toward the political left after he received his first paycheck and realized how much money the government took in tax. He reasoned that if the government was taking so much money, it should at least provide first-rate healthcare and education.

As a public intellectual, Vidal was identified with the liberal politicians and the progressive social causes of the old Democratic Party.

In 1960, Vidal was the Democratic nominee for Congress in the 29th Congressional District of New York, a usually Republican district that included most of the Catskills and the western bank of the Hudson River, including Newburgh. He lost to the Republican nominee, J. Ernest Wharton, 57% to 43%. Campaigning under the slogan You'll get more with Gore, Vidal received the most votes any Democratic candidate had received in the district in 50 years and outpolled John F. Kennedy (who lost the district with 38% of the vote). Among his supporters were Eleanor Roosevelt, Paul Newman, and Joanne Woodward, friends who spoke on his behalf.

In 1982, he campaigned against Jerry Brown, the incumbent governor of California, in the Democratic primary election for U.S. Senate. He placed second in the primary with 15% of the vote to Brown's 51%. Vidal accurately predicted that the Republican nominee, Pete Wilson, would win the election. His foray into senatorial politics is the subject of Gary Conklin's 1983 documentary film Gore Vidal: The Man Who Said No.

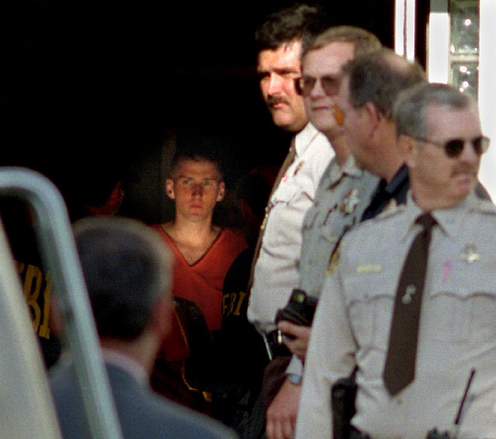
In 2001, Vanity Fair published an article by Vidal on Timothy McVeigh. The article attempts to understand why McVeigh perpetrated the 1995 Oklahoma City bombing.

In a 2001 article, "The Meaning of Timothy McVeigh", Gore undertook to discover why domestic terrorist Timothy McVeigh perpetrated the Oklahoma City bombing in 1995. He concluded that McVeigh (a politically disillusioned U.S. Army veteran of the First Iraq War) had destroyed the Alfred P. Murrah Federal Building as an act of revenge for the FBI's Waco massacre (1993) at the Branch Davidian Compound in Texas, believing that the U.S. government had mistreated Americans in the same manner that he believed the U.S. Army had mistreated the Iraqis. In the article, Vidal calls McVeigh an "unlikely sole mover" and theorizes that foreign/domestic conspiracies could have been involved.

Vidal strongly opposed military intervention in the world. In Dreaming War: Blood for Oil and the Cheney-Bush Junta (2002), he wrote that President Franklin D. Roosevelt provoked Imperial Japan to attack the U.S. to justify its entry into World War II. He contended that Roosevelt had advance knowledge of the attack on Pearl Harbor. In the documentary Why We Fight (2005), Vidal said that, during the war's final months, the Japanese had tried to surrender: "They were trying to surrender all that summer, but Truman wouldn't listen, because Truman wanted to drop the bombs ... To show off. To frighten Stalin. To change the balance of power in the world. To declare war on communism. Perhaps we were starting a pre-emptive world war".

=== Criticism of George W. Bush ===
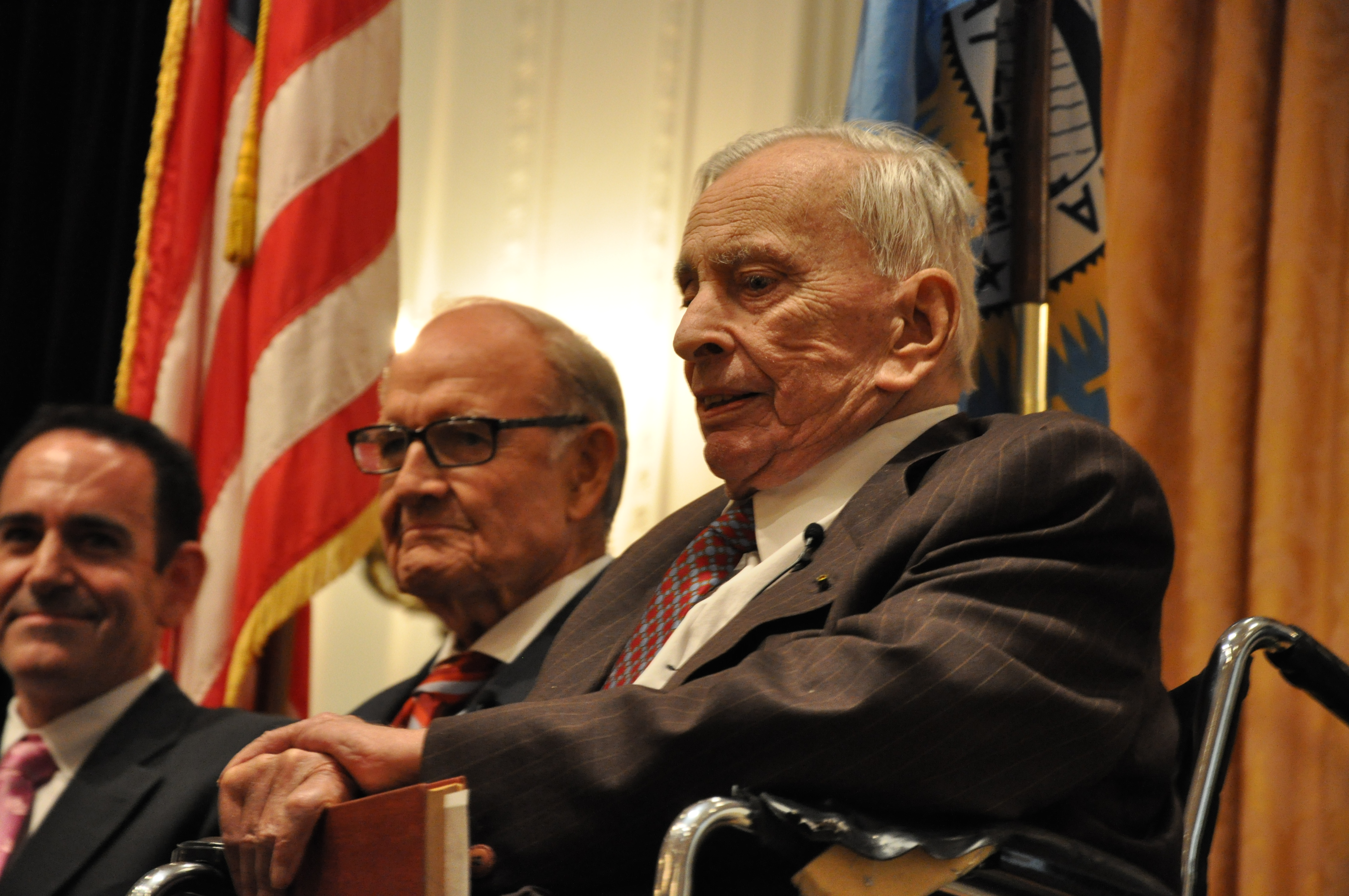
Vidal and ex-senator George McGovern at the Richard Nixon Presidential Library and Museum, August 26, 2009

Vidal criticized what he saw as political harm to the nation and the voiding of citizen's rights through the passage of the USA Patriot Act (2001) during the George W. Bush administration. He called Bush "the stupidest man in the United States" and said his foreign policy was explicitly expansionist. He contended that the Bush administration and its oil-business sponsors aimed to control the petroleum of Central Asia after having gained hegemony over the petroleum of the Persian Gulf in 1991.

Vidal became a member of the board of advisors of The World Can't Wait, a political organization that publicly repudiated the Bush administration's foreign-policy program and advocated Bush's impeachment for war crimes, such as the Second Iraq War and torturing prisoners of war (soldiers, guerrillas, civilians) in violation of international law.

In 2007, while discussing 9/11 conspiracy theories that might explain the "who?" and the "why?" of the September 11 attacks, Vidal said:

I'm not a conspiracy theorist, I'm a conspiracy analyst. Everything the Bushites touch is screwed up. They could never have pulled off 9/11, even if they wanted to. Even if they longed to. They could step aside, though, or just go out to lunch while these terrible things were happening to the nation. I believe that of them.

=== Political philosophy ===
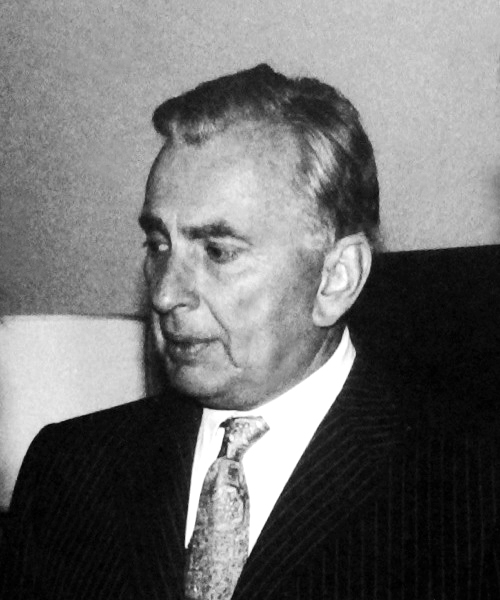
Vidal, c. 1978

In the American Conservative article "My Pen Pal Gore Vidal" (2012), Bill Kauffman wrote that Vidal's favorite American politician, during his lifetime, was Huey Long, the populist governor and senator from Louisiana, who also had perceived the essential, one-party nature of U.S. politics and who was assassinated by a lone gunman, Carl Weiss.

Despite that, Vidal said, "I think of myself as a conservative" with a proprietary attitude toward the United States. "My family helped start [this country] ... and we've been in political life ... since the 1690s, and I have a very possessive sense about this country". Based upon that background of populism, from 1970 to 1972 Vidal was a chairman of the People's Party of the United States. In 1971, he endorsed the consumer-rights advocate Ralph Nader for U.S. president in the 1972 election. In 2007, he endorsed Democrat Dennis Kucinich for president (in 2008), because Kucinich was "the most eloquent of the lot" of presidential candidates from either party and "very much a favorite out there, in the amber fields of grain".

In a 2009 interview with The Times of London, Vidal said there soon would be a dictatorship in the United States. The newspaper emphasized that Vidal, described as "the Grand Old Man of American belles-lettres", claimed that America was rotting away and to not expect Barack Obama to save the country and the nation from imperial decay. In this interview, Vidal also updated his views of his life, the U.S., and other political subjects. Vidal had earlier described what he saw as the political and cultural rot in the U.S. in his essay "The State of the Union" (1975):

There is only one party in the United States, the Property Party ... and it has two right wings: Republican and Democrat. Republicans are a bit stupider, more rigid, more doctrinaire in their laissez-faire capitalism than the Democrats, who are cuter, prettier, a bit more corrupt—until recently ... and more willing than the Republicans to make small adjustments when the poor, the black, the anti-imperialists get out of hand. But, essentially, there is no difference between the two parties.

== Feuds ==
=== The Capote–Vidal feud ===
In 1975, Vidal sued writer Truman Capote for slander over the accusation that he had once been thrown out of the White House for being drunk, putting his arm around First Lady Jacqueline Kennedy, and insulting her mother. Capote said of Vidal at the time: "I'm always sad about Gore—very sad that he has to breathe every day." Mutual friend George Plimpton observed: "There's no venom like Capote's when he's on the prowl—and Gore's too, I don't know what division the feud should be in." The suit was settled in Vidal's favor when Lee Radziwill refused to testify on Capote's behalf, telling columnist Liz Smith, "Oh, Liz, what do we care; they're just a couple of fags! They're disgusting."

=== The Buckley–Vidal feud ===
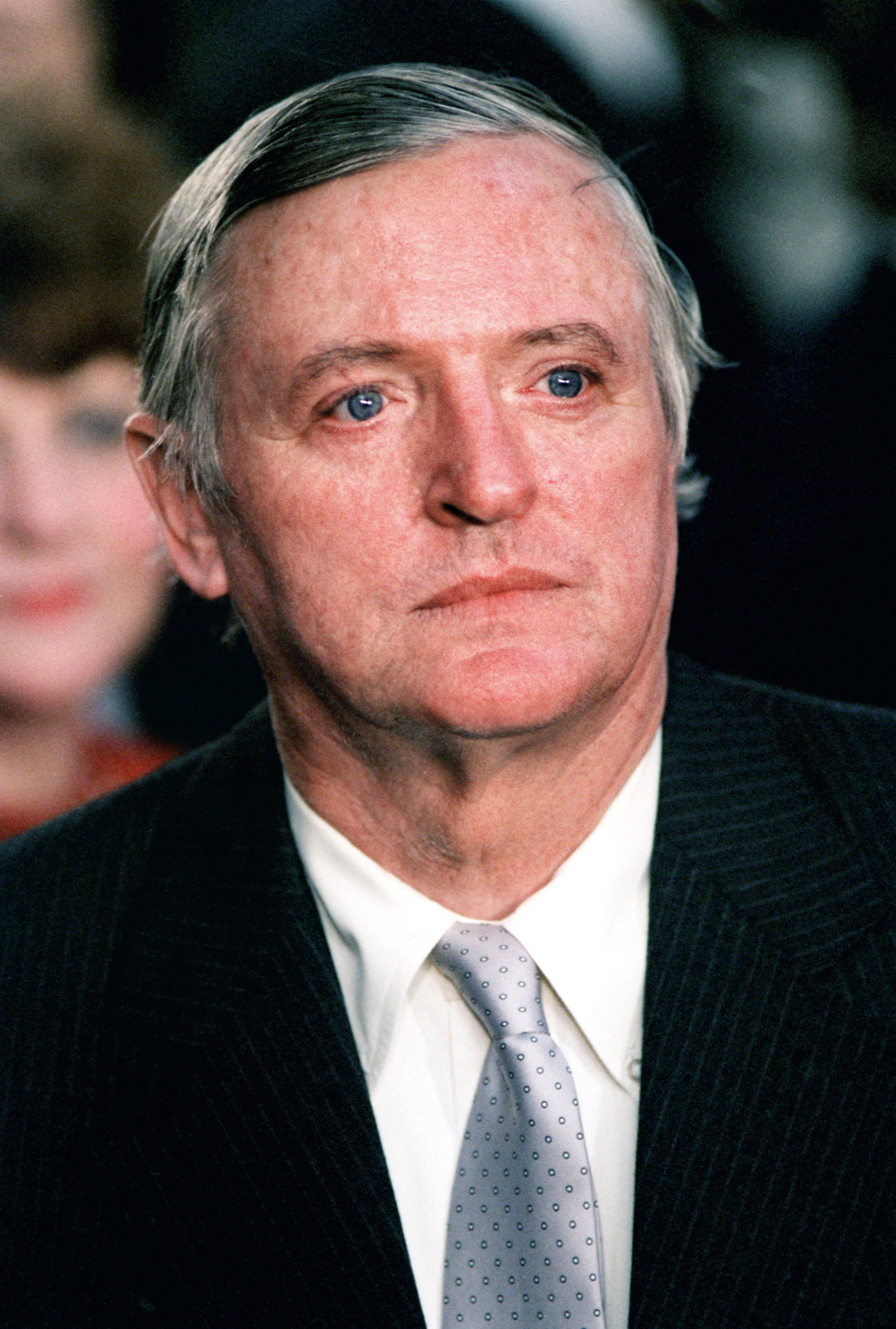
The feud between Vidal and William F. Buckley Jr. (pictured) lasted until the latter's death in 2008.

In 1968, the ABC television network hired the liberal Vidal and the conservative William F. Buckley Jr. as political analysts of the presidential-nomination conventions of the Republican and Democratic parties. After days of bickering, their debates devolved into vitriolic ad hominem attacks. During a moment of crosstalk while discussing the 1968 Democratic National Convention protests, the pair argued about freedom of speech—specifically, the legality of protesters' displaying a Viet Cong flag in America—Vidal snapped at Buckley, "shut up a minute". Moments later, the following exchange transpired:

BUCKLEY: Some people were pro-Nazi, and the answer is that they were well treated by people who ostracized them. And I'm for ostracizing people who egg on other people to shoot American Marines and American soldiers.

VIDAL: As far as I'm concerned, the only sort of pro- or crypto-Nazi I can think of is yourself. Failing that, I would only say that we can't have—

BUCKLEY: Now listen, you queer, stop calling me a crypto-Nazi or I'll sock you in your goddamn face and you'll stay plastered.

ABC's Howard K. Smith intervened, and the debate resumed without violence. Later, Buckley said he regretted calling Vidal a "queer" but still expressed some distaste for Vidal when he said that he was an "evangelist for bisexuality".

In August 1969, in Esquire magazine, Buckley continued his cultural feud with Vidal in the essay "On Experiencing Gore Vidal", in which he portrayed Vidal as an apologist for homosexuality; Buckley said, "The man who, in his essays, proclaims the normalcy of his affliction [i.e., homosexuality], and in his art the desirability of it, is not to be confused with the man who bears his sorrow quietly. The addict is to be pitied and even respected, not the pusher." The essay is collected in The Governor Listeth: A Book of Inspired Political Revelations (1970), an anthology of Buckley's writings.

Vidal riposted in Esquire with the September 1969 essay "A Distasteful Encounter with William F. Buckley, Jr." and said that Buckley was "anti-black", "anti-semitic" and a "warmonger". Buckley sued Vidal for libel.

The feud continued in Esquire, where Vidal implied that in 1944, Buckley and unnamed siblings had vandalized a Protestant church in Sharon, Connecticut (the Buckley family hometown), after a pastor's wife had sold a house to a Jewish family. Additionally, Vidal later claimed to know that Buckley was "rather infatuated" with him. Buckley again sued Vidal and Esquire for libel and Vidal filed a counterclaim for libel against Buckley, citing Buckley's characterization of Myra Breckinridge (1968) as a pornographic novel. The court dismissed Vidal's counterclaim. Buckley accepted a settlement of $115,000 to pay his attorney's fee and an editorial apology from Esquire, in which the publisher and the editors said they were "utterly convinced" of the falsity of Vidal's assertions. In a letter to Newsweek magazine, the publisher of Esquire wrote, "the settlement of Buckley's suit against us" was not "a 'disavowal' of Vidal's article. On the contrary, it clearly states that we published that article because we believed that Vidal had a right to assert his opinions, even though we did not share them."

In Gore Vidal: A Biography (1999), Fred Kaplan wrote, "The court had 'not' sustained Buckley's case against Esquire ... [that] the court had 'not' ruled that Vidal's article was 'defamatory'. It had ruled that the case would have to go to trial in order to determine, as a matter of fact, whether or not it was defamatory. The cash value of the settlement with Esquire represented 'only' Buckley's legal expenses."

In 2003, Buckley resumed his complaint of having been libeled by Vidal, this time with the publication of the anthology Esquire's Big Book of Great Writing (2003), which included Vidal's essay "A Distasteful Encounter with William F. Buckley, Jr." Buckley again sued for libel and Esquire again settled Buckley's claim with $55,000–65,000 for his attorney's fees and $10,000 for personal damages.

In the obituary "RIP WFB – in Hell" (March 20, 2008), Vidal remembered Buckley, who had died on February 27, 2008. In the interview "Literary Lion: Questions for Gore Vidal" (June 15, 2008), New York Times reporter Deborah Solomon asked Vidal: "How did you feel when you heard that Buckley died this year?" Vidal responded:

I thought hell is bound to be a livelier place, as he joins, forever, those whom he served in life, applauding their prejudices and fanning their hatred.

=== The Mailer–Vidal feud ===
On December 15, 1971, during the recording of The Dick Cavett Show, with Janet Flanner, Norman Mailer allegedly head-butted Vidal backstage. When a reporter asked Vidal why Mailer had knocked heads with him, Vidal said, "Once again, words failed Norman Mailer." During the recording of the show, Vidal and Mailer insulted each other over what Vidal had written about him, prompting Mailer to say, "I've had to smell your works from time to time." Apparently, Mailer's umbrage resulted from Vidal's reference to Mailer having stabbed his wife of the time.

== Beliefs and ideology ==
=== Polanski rape case ===
In The Atlantic magazine interview "A Conversation with Gore Vidal" (October 2009), by John Meroney, Vidal spoke about topical and cultural matters of U.S. society. Asked his opinion about the arrest of the film director Roman Polanski in response to an extradition request by U.S. authorities for having fled the U.S. in 1978 to avoid jail for the statutory rape of a 13-year-old girl, Vidal said: "I really don't give a fuck. Look, am I going to sit and weep every time a young hooker feels as though she's been taken advantage of?"

Asked to elaborate, Vidal explained the cultural temper of the U.S. and of the Hollywood movie business in the 1970s:

The [news] media can't get anything straight. Plus, there's usually an anti-Semitic and anti-fag thing going on with the press—lots of crazy things. The idea that this girl was in her communion dress, a little angel, all in white, being raped by this awful Jew Polacko—that's what people were calling him—well, the story is totally different now from what it was then ... Anti-Semitism got poor Polanski. He was also a foreigner. He did not subscribe to American values, in the least. To [his persecutors], that seemed vicious and unnatural.

Asked to explain the term "American values", Vidal replied: "Lying and cheating. There's nothing better."

In response to Vidal's opinion about the Polanski case, a spokeswoman for the organization Survivors Network of those Abused by Priests, Barbara Dorris, said, "People should express their outrage by refusing to buy any of his books", called Vidal a "mean-spirited buffoon", and said that, although "a boycott wouldn't hurt Vidal financially", it would "cause anyone else with such callous views to keep his mouth shut, and [so] avoid rubbing salt into the already deep wounds" of sexual abuse survivors.

=== Scientology ===
In 1997, Vidal was one of 34 public intellectuals and celebrities who joined a publicity campaign waged by Scientologists against the German government, signing an open letter addressed to German Chancellor Helmut Kohl, published in the International Herald Tribune, alleging that Scientologists in Germany were treated "in the same way that the Nazi regime persecuted the Jews". Scientologists are free to operate in Germany, but the Church of Scientology is recognized not as a religious body but as a business with political goals and thus monitored by the German domestic intelligence service. Despite signing the letter, Vidal was critical of Scientology as a religion.

=== Sexuality ===
In 1967, Vidal appeared in the CBS documentary CBS Reports: The Homosexuals, in which he debated homosexuality with professor Albert Goldman. Vidal criticized what he viewed as restrictive social attitudes toward sexuality, saying: "The United States is living out some mad Protestant nineteenth-century dream of human behavior.... I think the so-called breaking of the moral fiber of this country is one of the healthiest things that's begun to happen."

Vidal frequently challenged conventional understandings of sexual orientation, arguing that it fell along a spectrum rather than into distinct categories. In the September 1969 issue of Esquire, he wrote:

We are all bisexual to begin with. That is a fact of our condition. And we are all responsive to sexual stimuli from our own as well as from the opposite sex. Certain societies at certain times, usually in the interest of maintaining the baby supply, have discouraged homosexuality. Other societies, particularly militaristic ones, have exalted it. But regardless of tribal taboos, homosexuality is a constant fact of the human condition and it is not a sickness, not a sin, not a crime ... despite the best efforts of our puritan tribe to make it all three. Homosexuality is as natural as heterosexuality. Notice I use the word "natural", not normal.

In a 1974 interview with the Miami Herald, Vidal criticized religious and psychiatric condemnations of homosexuality and reiterated his belief that homosexual and heterosexual acts should be regarded equally:

Jewish psychiatrists are fundamentalists who should have been rabbis. They present their Mosaic taboos in the guise of science. The Jewish code was monstrous. The Christian one is equally monstrous. The Jews thought women were s--- and passed this on to the Christians. And they also passed on the rabbinical concept that there is something wicked about the homosexual act. ... All I have ever argued is that the heterosexual and the homosexual act should have absolute parity. Instead we are taught all this nonsense by Dr. David Reuben: if you're a homosexualist, you're immature; if you're promiscuous, you're not capable of a sustained emotional relationship. Oh, dear.

Despite his public defense of homosexuality, Vidal often repudiated the label "gay", maintaining that it described sexual acts rather than an identity. In Celebrity: The Advocate Interviews (1995), he said he refused to call himself "gay" because "to be categorized is, simply, to be enslaved", adding that he had long maintained that everyone is bisexual. According to his friend Jay Parini, "Gore didn't think of himself as a gay guy. It makes him self-hating. How could he despise gays as much as he did? In my company he always used the term 'fags'. He was uncomfortable with being gay. Then again, he was wildly courageous."

Vidal did not take a prominent public role in activism surrounding the HIV/AIDS crisis of the 1980s and 1990s. Biographer Fred Kaplan wrote that Vidal "was not interested in making a difference for gay people, or being an advocate for gay rights. There was no such thing as 'straight' or 'gay' for him, just the body and sex."

== Personal life ==
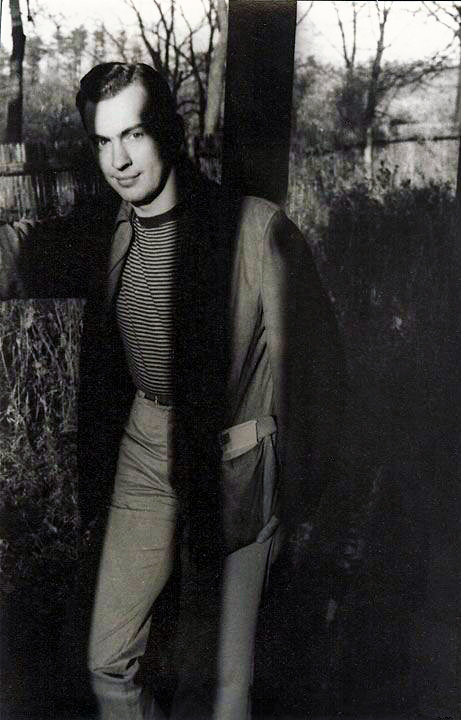
Vidal as a young man

=== Relationships ===
In her multi-volume memoir The Diary of Anaïs Nin, Anaïs Nin said she had had a love affair with Vidal, who denied it in his memoir Palimpsest (1995). In the 2013 article "Gore Vidal's Secret, Unpublished Love Letter to Anaïs Nin", writer Kim Krizan said she found an unpublished love letter from Vidal to Nin that contradicts his denial. Krizan said she found the letter while researching Mirages, the latest volume of Nin's uncensored diary, to which Krizan wrote the foreword.

Vidal cruised streets and bars in New York City and elsewhere and wrote in his memoir that by age 25 he had had more than 1,000 sexual encounters. He also said he had an intermittent romance with actress Diana Lynn and alluded to possibly having fathered a daughter. Vidal enjoyed telling friends about his sexual exploits. He claimed to have slept with Fred Astaire when he first moved to Hollywood and also with Dennis Hopper.

Vidal was briefly engaged to Joanne Woodward before she married Paul Newman; after marrying, they briefly shared a house with Vidal in Los Angeles.

On Labor Day 1950, Vidal met Howard Austen at the Everard Baths in New York City. Austen soon moved in with Vidal and assumed responsibility for many of his personal and business affairs. Although the two maintained separate bedrooms and had "separate interests" sexually, they remained devoted companions until Austen's death more than 50 years later. Vidal attributed the longevity of their relationship to the absence of sex, remarking, "It's easy to sustain a relationship when sex plays no part, and impossible, I have observed, when it does." Austen died from a brain tumor in September 2003. In February 2005, his remains were reinterred at Rock Creek Cemetery in Washington, D.C., in a shared grave plot that Vidal had purchased for both of them.

=== Residences ===
Vidal lived at various times in Italy and in the United States. In 1950, he bought the riverfront Edgewater estate in Barrytown, New York, at his friend Alice Astor Bouverie's recommendation. According to his memoir, he paid $16,000, with a $6,000 down payment and a $10,000 mortgage. In 1960, he was the Democratic nominee for the 29th Congressional District of New York State and used Edgewater as his campaign headquarters. He lost to the Republican nominee, J. Ernest Wharton, 57% to 43%. Among Vidal's supporters were Eleanor Roosevelt, Paul Newman, and Joanne Woodward, all of whom spoke on his behalf. While living at Edgewater he was a lecturer at nearby Bard College.

In November 1966, Vidal, then living in Italy, rented Edgewater to William vanden Heuvel, a lawyer, aide to Robert F. Kennedy, and husband of the writer Jean Stein. In 1969, Vidal sold Edgewater to New York financier Richard Jenrette for $125,000.

In 1972, Vidal purchased the Italian villa La Rondinaia ("The Swallow's Nest") in Ravello, on the Amalfi coast. He entertained notable guests at his home, including Andy Warhol, Mick Jagger, Paul Newman, Princess Margaret, and Johnny Carson. In 2003, as his health declined, Vidal sold La Rondinaia, and he and Austen returned to live at their villa in Outpost Estates, Los Angeles.

== Death ==
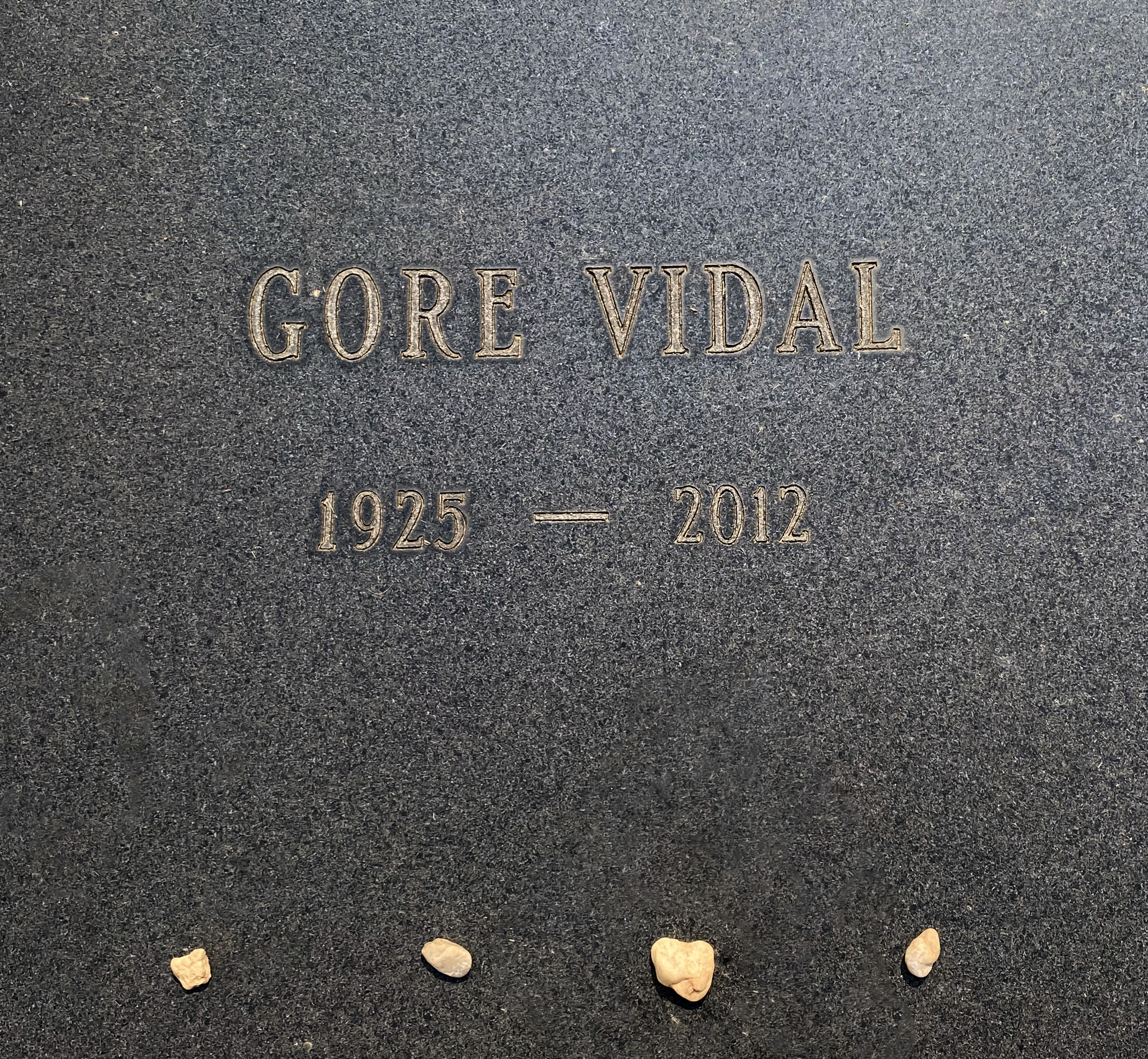
The grave of Gore Vidal in Rock Creek Cemetery.

In 2010, Vidal began to suffer from Wernicke–Korsakoff syndrome. On July 31, 2012, he died of pneumonia at his home in the Hollywood Hills, aged 86. A memorial service was held for him at the Gerald Schoenfeld Theatre in New York City on August 23, 2012. He was buried next to Howard Austen in Rock Creek Cemetery, in Washington, D.C.

Vidal said he chose his gravesite because it is between the graves of two people who were important in his life: Henry Adams, the historian and writer, whose work Vidal admired; and his boyhood friend Jimmie Trimble, who was killed in World War II, a tragedy that haunted Vidal for the rest of his life. Upon his death, Vidal bequeathed the entirety of his estate, valued at $37 million, to Harvard University.

== Legacy ==
Postmortem opinions and assessments of Vidal as a writer vary. The New York Times called him "an Augustan figure who believed himself to be the last of a breed, and he was probably right. Few American writers have been more versatile, or gotten more mileage from their talent." The Los Angeles Times said he was a literary juggernaut whose novels and essays were considered "among the most elegant in the English language". The Washington Post described him as a "major writer of the modern era ... [an] astonishingly versatile man of letters".

The Guardian wrote, "Vidal's critics disparaged his tendency to formulate an aphorism, rather than to argue, finding in his work an underlying note of contempt for those who did not agree with him. His fans, on the other hand, delighted in his unflagging wit and elegant style." The Daily Telegraph called Vidal "an icy iconoclast" who "delighted in chronicling what he perceived as the disintegration of civilisation around him". The BBC News said he was "one of the finest post-war American writers ... an indefatigable critic of the whole American system ... Gore Vidal saw himself as the last of the breed of literary figures who became celebrities in their own right. Never a stranger to chat shows, his wry and witty opinions were sought after as much as his writing." In "The Culture of the United States Laments the Death of Gore Vidal", the Spanish online magazine Ideal wrote that Vidal's death was a loss to the "culture of the United States" and called him a "great American novelist and essayist". In The Writer Gore Vidal is Dead in Los Angeles, the online edition of the Italian newspaper Corriere della Sera called Vidal "the enfant terrible of American culture" and "one of the giants of American literature". In Gore Vidal: The Killjoy of America, the French newspaper Le Figaro said that the public intellectual Vidal was "the killjoy of America" but that he also was an "outstanding polemicist" who used words "like high-precision weapons".

On August 23, 2012, in the program A Memorial for Gore Vidal in Manhattan, Vidal's life and works were celebrated at the Gerald Schoenfeld Theatre, with a revival of The Best Man: A Play About Politics (1960). The writer and comedian Dick Cavett hosted the celebration, which featured personal reminiscences about and performances of excerpts of Vidal's work by friends and colleagues, such as Elizabeth Ashley, Candice Bergen, Hillary Clinton, Alan Cumming, James Earl Jones, Elaine May, Michael Moore, Susan Sarandon, Cybill Shepherd, and Liz Smith.

In the 1960s, Vidal selected the Wisconsin Center for Film and Theater Research at the University of Wisconsin–Madison to archive his papers, given his early focus on film. In 2002, he transferred his papers to Houghton Library at Harvard University, where they remain.

=== In popular culture ===
The character Brinker Hadley in John Knowles's 1959 novel A Separate Peace is based on Vidal. Knowles and Vidal attended Philips Exeter Academy together, Vidal two years ahead of Knowles. Vidal acknowledged the connection and professed admiration for the novel in his memoir.

In the 1960s, the weekly American sketch comedy television program Rowan & Martin's Laugh-In featured a running-joke sketch about Vidal; the telephone operator Ernestine (Lily Tomlin) would call him, saying: "Mr. Veedle, this is the phone company calling! (snort! snort!)." The sketch, titled "Mr. Veedle", also appeared in Tomlin's comedy record album This Is a Recording (1972).

Vidal provided his own voice for the animated-cartoon version of himself in The Simpsons episode "Moe'N'a Lisa". He also voiced his animated-cartoon version in Family Guy. He was interviewed in the Da Ali G Show; Ali G mistakes him for Vidal Sassoon, a famous hairdresser.

The Buckley-Vidal debates, their aftermath and cultural significance, were the focus of the 2015 documentary film Best of Enemies, as well as the 2021 play by James Graham inspired by the film.

In season eight, episode eight of The Office, "Gettysburg", Oscar Martinez calls Dwight Schrute "Gore Vidal" when Dwight tries to explain his version of history naming the "Battle of Schrute Farms" as the northernmost battle in the Civil War. Dwight responds to Oscar that he doesn't "know who that is".

A Netflix biopic, Gore, was filmed in 2017. It was directed and co-written by Michael Hoffman and based on Jay Parini's book Empire of Self, A Life of Gore Vidal. The film, which starred Kevin Spacey in the title role, was canceled and remains unreleased due to sexual misconduct allegations against Spacey.

== Selected list of works ==
- The City and the Pillar (1948)
- The Best Man (1960)
- Julian (1964)
- Myra Breckinridge (1968)
- Kalki (1978)
- Creation (1981)

The Narratives of Empire series (chronological order rather than release order):

1. Burr (1973)
2. Lincoln (1984)
3. 1876 (1976)
4. Empire (1987)
5. Hollywood (1990)
6. Washington, D.C. (1967)
7. The Golden Age (2000)

=== Filmography ===
Year	Title	Role	Notes
1972	Roma	Himself	Uncredited
1992	Bob Roberts	Senator Brikley Paiste	
1994	With Honors	Pitkannen	
1997	Shadow Conspiracy	Congressman Page	
1997	Gattaca	Director Josef	
2002	Igby Goes Down	First School Headmaster	Uncredited
2005	Middle Sexes: Redefining He and She	Narrator	
2009	Shrink	George Charles	

== See also ==
- List of Venice Film Festival jury presidents
- Politics in fiction
