= Messiah (Vidal novel) =

1954 novel by Gore Vidal

Messiah (1954 novel)
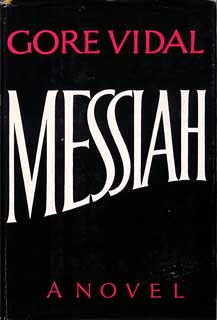
- Cover of the first edition
- Author: Gore Vidal
- Language: English
- Publisher: E. P. Dutton & Co., Inc., New York City
- Publication date: April 26, 1954
- Publication place: United States
- Media type: Print (hardback & paperback)
- Pages: 222
- ISBN: 9780141180397
- Preceded by: The Judgement of Paris
- Followed by: A Thirsty Evil
- Text: Messiah (1954 novel) online

Messiah is a satirical novel by Gore Vidal, first published in 1954 in the United States by E.P. Dutton. It is the story of the creation of a new religion, Cavism, which quickly comes to replace the established but failing Christian religion.

== Plot summary ==
The novel is written as the memoir of Eugene Luther (Vidal's birth name), one of the first followers of Cavism, founded by John Cave, an American undertaker. Cave teaches, among other things, not to fear death and to actually desire it under certain circumstances. Later followers come to glorify death, and even enforce it on other members. The founder John Cave is himself killed by his followers when he proves inconvenient for the new religion's development.

Eventually, Cavism is successful in completely displacing and exterminating Christianity, even to the extent of all Gothic Cathedrals being systematically blown up and destroyed in order to erase any memory of the tradition. The narrator, having quarrelled with the other religious leaders, finds refuge in Egypt – Islamic countries having forbidden Cavism any access to their territory. He eventually discovers that his name was removed from the Cavist Scriptures which he had himself composed. Also, a woman Cavist leader named Iris, whom he had known, becomes a new manifestation of the ancient Mother Goddess – which had earlier been manifested in The Virgin Mary and before that in Isis and others. This "Irisian" element becomes grafted onto Cavism, as it was earlier grafted onto Christianity.

== See also ==
- Jim Jones
- David Koresh
- Heaven's Gate
