= Washington, D.C. (novel) =

1967 novel by Gore Vidal

- Cover of the first edition
- Author: Gore Vidal
- Language: English
- Series: Narratives of Empire
- Genre: Historical novel
- Publisher: Little, Brown
- Publication date: 1967
- Publication place: United States
- Media type: Print (hardback & paperback)
- Pages: 432
- ISBN: 0-375-70877-4
- OCLC: 49559031
- Dewey Decimal: 813/.54 21
- LC Class: PS3543.I26 W3 2000
- Preceded by: Hollywood
- Followed by: The Golden Age

Washington, D.C. is a 1967 novel by Gore Vidal. The sixth novel in his Narratives of Empire series of historical novels (although the first one published), it begins in 1937 and continues into the Cold War, tracing the families of Senator James Burden Day and influential newspaper publisher Blaise Sanford. This book is the least historical of the seven books. The seventh book in the series, The Golden Age, takes place during the same span of years with many of the same characters as Washington, D.C. The novel is written in the third person and is inspired by the novels of Henry James.
