= Frederick Rutland =

British WWI naval aviator

Frederick Joseph Rutland
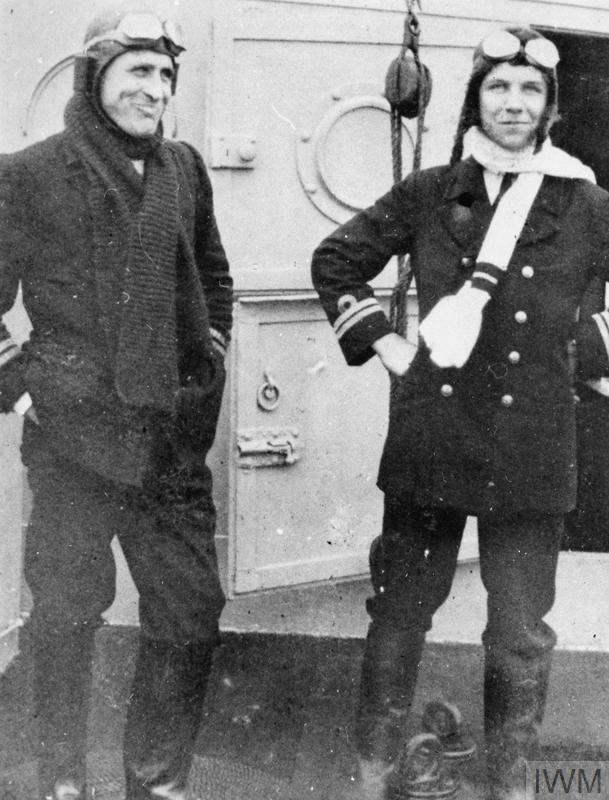
- Rutland (left) with Lieutenant Gerald Livock on HMS Engadine, 1916
- Born: 21 October 1886; Weymouth, England, United Kingdom
- Died: 28 January 1949 (aged 62); Beddgelert, Wales, United Kingdom
- Military career
- Allegiance: United Kingdom; Japan
- Branch: Royal Naval Air Service; Royal Air Force
- Service years: 1901–1923
- Rank: Squadron Leader
- Conflicts: First World War
- Awards: Distinguished Service Cross & Bar; Albert Medal

Frederick Joseph Rutland, DSC & Bar, AM (21 October 1886 – 28 January 1949) was a British pioneer of naval aviation. A decorated pilot in the First World War, he earned the nickname "Rutland of Jutland" for his exploits at the Battle of Jutland in 1916.

During the interwar period, he worked as a secret agent for Japan. British authorities interned him during the Second World War and he was released in 1943. The Japanese leveraged his presence at high-society parties to extract intelligence on American aviation technology from aircraft executives and naval officers. He also scouted Pearl Harbor's defenses for Japan prior to the attack.

== "Rutland of Jutland" ==
Rutland joined the Royal Navy as a boy seaman in 1901. He was graded as Flight Sub-Lieutenant in the Royal Naval Air Service (RNAS) in December 1914, awarded his aviator's certificate by the Royal Aero Club on 26 January 1915 after training at Eastchurch and promoted to Lieutenant on 7 January 1916.

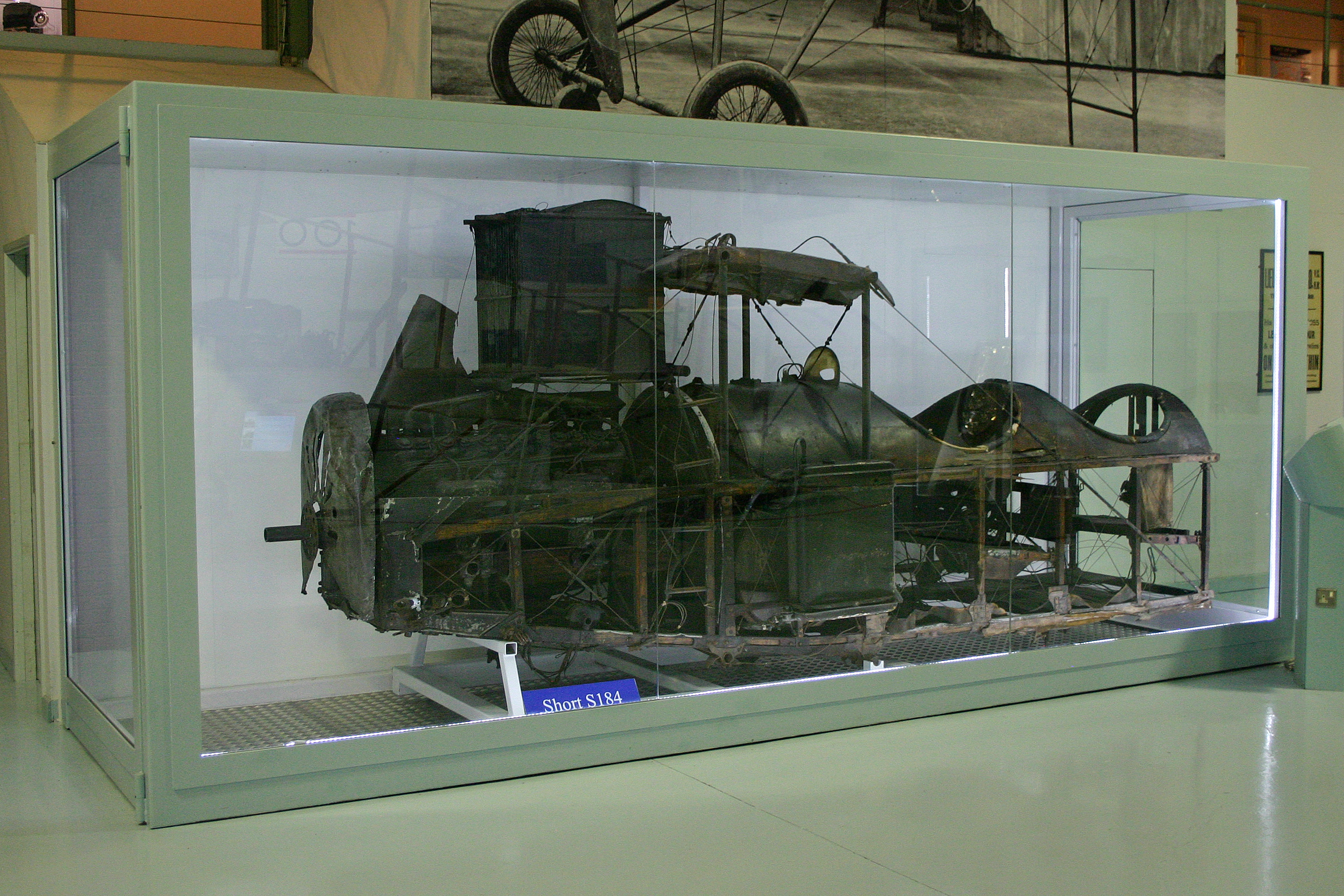
Remnants of Rutland's Short Type 184 at the Fleet Air Arm Museum. While it survived the First World War intact, it was damaged by bombing during the Second World War.

At Jutland he served as a pilot on the seaplane tender HMS Engadine. On 30 May 1916, Engadine carried two Short Type 184 and two Sopwith Baby floatplanes and was attached to the 3rd Light Cruiser Squadron. Engadine accompanied the cruisers when the Battlecruiser Fleet sortied from Rosyth that evening to intercept the German High Seas Fleet. Beatty ordered Engadine to make a search to the north-northeast. At 15:07 Rutland took off in his Type 184 and his observer, Assistant Paymaster George Stanley Trewin, signalled Engadine that they had spotted three German cruisers and five destroyers at 15:30. This was the first time that a heavier-than-air aircraft had carried out a reconnaissance of an enemy fleet in action. After a few other spot reports were transmitted, the aircraft's fuel line ruptured around 15:36 and Rutland was forced to put his aircraft down. He was able to repair it and signalled that he was ready to take off again, but he was ordered to taxi to the carrier on the surface. The aircraft reached the ship at 15:47 and it was hoisted aboard by 16:04. Engadine attempted to relay the spot reports to Beatty's flagship and the flagship of the 5th Battle Squadron, but was unsuccessful. Rutland was awarded the Distinguished Service Cross (DSC) "for his gallantry and persistence in flying within close distance of the enemy light cruisers". He received a Bar to his DSC in 1917 for "services on patrol duties and submarine searching in home waters".

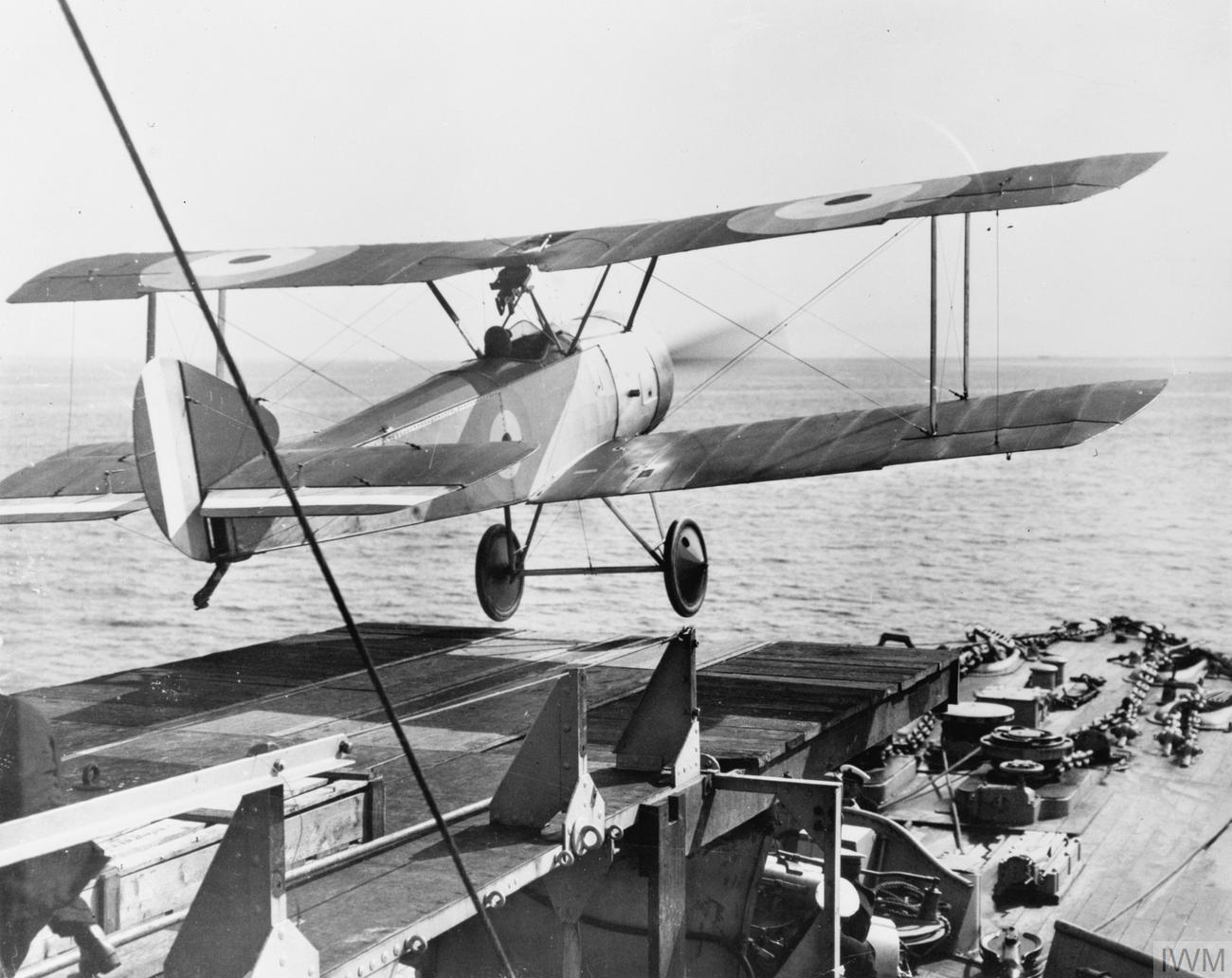
Rutland's Sopwith Pup takes off from a platform on the forward gun turret of HMS Yarmouth, June 1917

During the Battle of Jutland, the armoured cruiser HMS Warrior had been crippled by numerous hits by German battleships. At 19:45 Engadine attempted to take her in tow, but the jammed rudder prevented that until it was trained amidships. Early the following morning Warrior's progressive flooding had worsened and she was sinking. The captain ordered his ship abandoned after Engadine came alongside to take the crew off at 08:00. About 675 officers and men successfully made it to the much smaller Engadine. Among these were about 30 seriously wounded men who were transferred across in their stretchers; one man fell from his stretcher between the ships, but, against orders, Rutland dived overboard with a bowline to rescue him. For his bravery he was awarded the Albert Medal in Gold. Rutland's Short Type 184, aircraft number 8359, was presented to the Imperial War Museum in 1917, where it was damaged in a German air raid in 1940. The unrestored forward section of the fuselage is currently on loan from IWM to Fleet Air Arm Museum where it is on display to the public.

On 28 June 1917, Rutland, by now a Flight Commander, took off in a Sopwith Pup from a flying-off platform mounted on the roof of one of the gun turrets of the light cruiser HMS Yarmouth, the first such successful launch of an aircraft in history. He did more experiments on the battlecruiser HMS Repulse. It was the first capital ship fitted with a flying-off platform when an experimental one was fitted on 'B' turret in the autumn of 1917. On 1 October 1917, Rutland, now a Squadron Leader, took off in a Sopwith Pup. Another platform was built on 'Y' turret and Rutland successfully took off from it on 8 October 1917.

Rutland transferred to the Royal Air Force when it was formed in April 1918. He was appointed to command the RAF unit on the carrier HMS Eagle in September 1921. He resigned his commission in 1923.

== Post-First World War and espionage ==
Material released by The National Archives on 10 November 2000 revealed that Rutland had come to the notice of MI5 in 1922 when he decided to resign from the RAF. The agency received what it called "reliable information" from a "very delicate source" that the Japanese had secret talks with Rutland. MI5 noted that Rutland possessed "unique knowledge of aircraft carriers and deck landings."

In 1924, Rutland was divorced on the ground of adultery. He had been named as a co-respondent in a divorce case in 1923.

After he left the RAF, Rutland moved to Japan where he was employed helping the Imperial Japanese Navy learn about naval aviation. In 1928, he moved back to the UK. A representative of the Japanese Navy met Rutland in London and recruited him to be an agent in Los Angeles. Rutland started a cover business in Los Angeles and another in Honolulu. Later intercepts of Japanese communications showed that Tokyo had paid Rutland to set up a "small agency in Hawaii". He had subsequently provided technical details which helped the Japanese design aircraft carriers, in the years before the attack on Pearl Harbor. This was discovered when Japan's cyphers were broken.

FBI files released in 2017 contain numerous references to Rutland's espionage work for the Japanese Navy, as well as confirmation that he had become a double agent, helping the US Navy. In Rutland's work for the US Navy, he fed information on Japanese plans and attempted to set up a process to alert the US about the timing of the coming Japanese attack.

MI6 discovered that Rutland had come to the attention of the US authorities. He returned to Britain on 5 October 1941 and on 16 December 1941 he was interned under Defence Regulation 18B "by reason of alleged hostile associations". This internment was a special wartime program where those detained were jailed with no trial. Some of his former Royal Navy colleagues demanded his release, saying there was no proof of his doing anything illegal in Britain, and that both MI5 and the Americans blundered by not having Rutland help them prevent the Japanese attack. Rutland was released from custody in December 1943.

Rutland killed himself in 1949.

== Biography ==
Rutland is the subject of Beverly Hills Spy, a biography by Ronald Drabkin, published by Harper Collins in February 2024.

== See also ==
- Collaboration with the Empire of Japan
- Itaru Tachibana
- Patrick Stanley Vaughan Heenan
- William Forbes-Sempill, 19th Lord Sempill
- Pearl Harbor advance-knowledge conspiracy theory
- Japanese spy in Hawaii, Takeo Yoshikawa
- German spy in Hawaii, Kuehn Family

== Bibliography ==
Notes

References

- Bradbeer, Thomas (12 May 2016). "Frederick Rutland: Tinker, Sailor, Aviator, Spy". Weider History Group.
- Hansard (22 January 1942). "HC Deb vol 377 cc439". Parliamentary Debates (Hansard).
- The Daily Telegraph (10 November 2000). "Royal Navy hero officer 'was spy for Japanese'". Telegraph Media Group.
- Drabkin, Ron (9 April 2021). "Agent Shinkawa Revisited: The Japanese Navy's Establishment of the Rutland Intelligence Network in Southern California". International Journal of Intelligence and CounterIntelligence. 35: 31–56. doi:10.1080/08850607.2020.1871252.
- Everest-Phillips, Max (17 July 2006). "Reassessing pre-war Japanese espionage: The Rutland naval spy case and the Japanese intelligence threat before Pearl Harbor". Intelligence and National Security. 21 (2): 258–285. doi:10.1080/02684520600620732. S2CID 155070033.
- Fleet Air Arm Museum (2017). "Short 184 (8359)". Fleet Air Arm Museum. Archived from the original on 2 April 2014.
- Flight International (5 February 1915). "Aviator's Certificates". Flight International. ISSN 0015-3710.
- Flight International (13 July 1916). "Aircraft In The Naval Battle". Flight International. ISSN 0015-3710.
- Imperial War Museum (2017). "Lieutenant Frederick Joseph Rutland". Imperial War Museum. Archived from the original on 11 June 2016.
- Lashmar, Paul (10 November 2000). "Revealed: The man who started World War Two". The Independent. ISSN 0951-9467. OCLC 185201487.
- Layman, R. D. (1989). Before the aircraft carrier: the development of aviation vessels, 1849–1922. Conway Maritime. ISBN 9780851775166. - Total pages: 128
- The London Gazette (16 March 1915). "London Gazette Issue 29102". The London Gazette. British government.
- The London Gazette 29434 (11 January 1916). "London Gazette Issue 29434". The London Gazette. British government.
- The London Gazette 29703 (11 August 1916). "His bravery is reported to have been magnificent". The London Gazette. British government.
- The London Gazette 29751 (15 September 1916). "London Gazette Issue 29751". The London Gazette. British government.
- The London Gazette (28 September 1917). "London Gazette Issue 30316". The London Gazette. British government.
- The London Gazette (18 September 1923). "London Gazette Issue 32863". The London Gazette. British government.
- Norton-Taylor, Richard (10 November 2000). "British flying ace was spy for Japan". The Guardian.
- Raven, Alan; Roberts, John Arthur (1976). British battleships of World War Two: the development and technical history of the Royal Navy's battleships and battlecruisers from 1911 to 1946. Naval Institute Press. ISBN 9780870218170. - Total pages: 436
- Smith, Michael (2001). The Emperor's Codes: The Breaking of Japan's Secret Ciphers. Arcade Publishing. ISBN 9781559705684. - Total pages: 323
- Sturtivant, Ray (1990). British Naval Aviation: The Fleet Air Arm, 1917–1990. Naval Institute Press. ISBN 9780870210266. - Total pages: 224
- Williams, Allan (2014). Operation Crossbow: The Untold Story of Photographic Intelligence and the Search for Hitler's V Weapons. Random House. ISBN 9780099557333. - Total pages: 464
- Young, Desmond (1963). Rutland of Jutland. Cassell. - Total pages: 191
