= The Golden Age (Vidal novel) =

2000 novel by Gore Vidal

- Cover of the first edition
- Author: Gore Vidal
- Language: English
- Series: Narratives of Empire
- Genre: Historical novel
- Publisher: Doubleday
- Publication date: September 2000
- Publication place: United States
- Media type: Print (Hardback & Paperback)
- Pages: 467 pp
- ISBN: 0-385-50075-0
- OCLC: 44174305
- Dewey Decimal: 813/.54 21
- LC Class: PS3543.I26 G65 2000
- Preceded by: Washington, D.C.

The Golden Age, a historical novel published in 2000 by Gore Vidal, is the seventh and final novel in his Narratives of Empire series.

== Title ==
The title is more ironic than ambivalent, referring principally to hopes expressed by young Americans shortly after winning World War II.

== Plot introduction ==
The story begins in 1939 and features many of the characters and events that Gore Vidal introduced in his earlier novel, Washington, D.C. This includes the families of conservative Democratic Senator James Burden Day, and powerful newspaper publisher Blaise Sanford. The book inserts the character of Caroline Sanford, Blaise's half-sister and publishing partner, who was introduced in the prequels to Washington, D.C. It covers America's entry into World War II and the national politics of that time in some detail, and highlights of the post-war years, and then closes with a year-2000 retrospective.

== Plot summary ==
The action centers around President Franklin D. Roosevelt's maneuvers to get the United States into World War II while keeping his 1940 campaign pledge to America voters that "No sons of yours will ever fight in a foreign war, unless attacked." Vidal makes the case that 1) the U.S had backed Japan into a corner with the oil and trade embargo, as well as massive aid to China and unconditional demands Japan could never accept; 2) the U.S. provoked Japan into attacking; and 3) the U.S. had broken Japan's military codes and knew of Japan's pending attack, but intentionally withheld warning Pearl Harbor. This was to arouse the U.S. populace and use the attack to bring the United States into the war, so the U.S could take its place as the post-war dominant superpower.

The novel gives considerable attention to the rise of Wendell L. Willkie to become the Republican candidate in the 1940 Presidential Election, suggesting that Roosevelt's supporters grossly intervened in the affairs of the rival party to make sure that the Interventionist Willkie would win over Isolationist rivals, thus ensuring that whoever won the elections the US would enter the war. The book's detailed depiction of the 1940 Republican National Convention in Philadelphia even suggests—though offering no proof—that murder was resorted to in order to place a Willkie supporter in a key position of control over the convention's technical arrangements, and that such control was used to sabotage former president Herbert Hoover's bid for a comeback.

An often repeated theme is the reference to Roosevelt—and afterwards to Harry S. Truman—as "Emperor of the World", to Eleanor Roosevelt as "The Empress", to the Roosevelt White House as "The Imperial Court", to Washington D.C. as "The Imperial City" and so on. Roosevelt is compared to Augustus, the founder of the Roman Empire.

The novel also covers some of the American artistic and cultural scene after the war, with attention given to John La Touche, Dawn Powell, Vidal himself, Tennessee Williams, and postwar Hollywood.

== Characters ==
Historical characters:

- William Randolph Hearst
- Franklin D. Roosevelt
- Eleanor Roosevelt
- Harry Hopkins
- Wendell L. Willkie
- Herbert Hoover
- Harry Truman
- James O. Richardson
- Thomas Pryor Gore
- William Randolph Hearst
- John La Touche
- Dawn Powell
- Tennessee Williams
- Gore Vidal

Fictional characters include Caroline Sanford, Blaise Sanford, Peter Sanford, James Burden Day, Diana Day, Enid Sanford, Clay Overbury and Emma Sanford.

== Allusions/references to other works ==
- Charles A. Beard, President Roosevelt and the Coming of War
- George Orwell, Animal Farm
- Robert B. Stinnett, Day of Deceit
