= Michael John Smith =

Michael John Smith may refer to:

- Michael J. Smith (1945–1986), American astronaut
- Michael John Smith (espionage) (born 1948), British engineer convicted of spying for the Soviet Union

== See also ==
- Michael Smith (disambiguation)
