= Michael Smith =

Michael, Mick or Mike Smith may refer to:

== Arts ==
- Michael A. Smith (photographer) (1942–2018), American photographer
- Michael E. Smith (artist) (born 1977), American sculptor
- Michael Paul Smith (1950–2018), American artist and photographer
- Michael Smith (performance artist) (born 1951), American performance artist

== Entertainment ==
=== Film and television ===
- Michael Bailey Smith (born 1957), American film and television actor
- Mike Smith (actor) (born 1972), Canadian actor, screenwriter, comedian and musician
- Michael Smith (director), American film and television series director
- Valentine Michael Smith, chief character in Stranger in a Strange Land

=== Music ===
- Michael Joseph Smith (1938-2022), American classical and jazz composer and pianist
- Michael Peter Smith (1941–2020), American songwriter and performer
- Michael S. Smith (drummer) (1946–2006), American jazz drummer
- Michael W. Smith (born 1957), American Christian singer and musician
- Michael L. Smith (born 1953), known as Michael Lovesmith, American R&B musician, producer and executive
- Mike Smith (jazz saxophonist) (born 1957), American jazz saxophonist
- Mike Smith (singer-songwriter) (born 1939), American singer-songwriter
- Mike "Smitty" Smith (1942–2001), American drummer best known as a member of Paul Revere & the Raiders
- Mike Smith (Dave Clark Five) (1943–2008), English singer-songwriter
- Mike Smith (drummer) (born 1970), American drummer for Suffocation
- Mike Smith (guitarist) (born 1973), American guitarist for Limp Bizkit
- Mike Smith (American record producer), Cuban American record producer and musician
- Mike Smith (British record producer) (1935–2011)
- Mike Smith (saxophonist), English saxophonist for The Ailerons
- Mike Smith (born 1947), Welsh saxophonist (Amen Corner)

=== Other entertainment ===
- M. G. Smith (Michael G. Smith, 1921–1993), Jamaican poet and social anthropologist
- Michael Smith (poet) (1942–2014), Irish poet and translator
- Michael Smith (author) (born 1946), British author and journalist
- Mikey Smith (1954–1983), Jamaican dub poet and performance artist
- Michael Marshall Smith (born 1965), English novelist and screenwriter
- Michael Smith (chef) (born 1966), American born celebrity chef residing in Canada
- Michael V. Smith, Canadian novelist, poet and filmmaker
- Michael Farris Smith, American writer
- Mike Prestwood Smith, sound mixer
- Mike Smith (music executive), managing director of Columbia Records UK

== Politics ==
- Michael Smith (diplomat) (1936–2021), American diplomat and trade negotiator
- Michael Hoke Smith (1855–1931), American politician
- Michael Smith (Irish politician) (born 1940)
- Carl Michael Smith (born 1944), known as Mike, former Oklahoma Secretary of Energy
- Mike Smith (Louisiana politician) (born 1948), former Louisiana state senator, member of the Long family
- Michael F. Smith, member of the Delaware House of Representatives
- Michael Keith Smith (1953–2010), chairman of UK pressure group, the Conservative Democratic Alliance
- Michael K. Smith (Illinois politician) (1966–2014), member of the Illinois House of Representatives
- Michael K. Smith (Vermont official), secretary of human services for the state of Vermont, 2006–2008
- Mike Smith (Nova Scotia politician), mayor of Colchester County, Nova Scotia, Canada
- Michael Adye Smith (1886–1965), Australian politician
- Michael Smith (Georgia politician) (born 1983), member of the Georgia House of Representatives
- Michael D. Smith (government), chief executive officer of AmeriCorps
- Mike Smith (activist), New Zealand environmental and Māori rights activist

== Journalism ==
- Michael Townsend Smith (born 1935), theatre critic, music and dance critic, and playwright
- Michael Smith (newspaper reporter) (born 1952), reporter for The Sunday Times
- Mike Smith (broadcaster) (1955–2014), English television and radio presenter
- Michael Smith (Irish journalist) (born 1965), magazine editor and conservationist
- Michael Smith (writer) (born 1976), English writer and broadcaster
- Michael Smith (sports reporter) (born 1979), American sports reporter for The Boston Globe and ESPN
- Michael Smith (American journalist), American journalist for Bloomberg News

== Religion ==
- Michael Percival Smith (1924–2013), archdeacon of Maidstone, 1979–1989
- Michael Smith (bishop) (born 1940), Catholic bishop of Meath, Ireland
- Michael G. Smith (born 1955), Episcopal bishop of North Dakota, US

== Science ==
- Michael Smith (chemist) (1932–2000), Canadian Nobel Prize-winning chemist
- Michael J. Smith (1945–1986), American astronaut
- Michael E. Smith (archaeologist) (born 1953), American archaeologist and Mesoamerica scholar
- Michael D. Smith (computer scientist), dean of the Faculty of Arts and Sciences at Harvard University
- Michael D. Smith (economist), information technology and marketing professor
- C. Michael Smith (born 1950), clinical psychologist and scholar
- Mike Smith (archaeologist) (1955–2022), Australian archaeologist

== Sports ==
=== American football ===
- Mike Smith (American football coach) (born 1959), former head coach of the NFL Atlanta Falcons
- Mike Smith (linebacker) (born 1981), former NFL linebacker, current coach for the NFL Minnesota Vikings
- Michael Smith (running back) (born 1988), running back
- Michael Smith (American football coach), coach in the US
- Mike Smith (wide receiver) (born 1958), former NFL wide receiver
- Michael Smith (wide receiver) (born 1970), former NFL wide receiver
- Mike Smith (defensive back) (born 1962)

=== Association football ===
- Mike Smith (footballer, born 1935) (1935–2013), English defender
- Mike Smith (football manager) (1937–2021), English football manager
- Mick Smith (footballer) (born 1958), English defender
- Michael Smith (footballer, born 1988), Northern Irish defender
- Michael Smith (footballer, born 1991), English forward

=== Baseball ===
- Mike Smith (1890s outfielder) (1868–1945), MLB outfielder from 1886 to 1901
- Mike Smith (1920s outfielder) (1904–1981), MLB outfielder who played in the 1926 season
- Mike Smith (pitcher, born 1961), National League pitcher from 1984 to 1989
- Mike Smith (pitcher, born 1963), American League pitcher from 1989 to 1990
- Mike Smith (infielder) (born 1969), Rotary Smith Award winner
- Mike Smith (2000s pitcher) (born 1977), MLB pitcher in the 2000s

=== Basketball ===
- Mike Smith (basketball, born 1963), former professional basketball player from the University of South Carolina-Spartanburg
- Michael Smith (basketball, born 1965), former BYU and Boston Celtics player, and former Los Angeles Clippers television and radio commentator
- Michael Smith (basketball, born 1972), former NBA player from Washington, D.C.
- Mike Smith (basketball, born 1976), professional basketball player from West Monroe, Louisiana
- Mike Smith (basketball, born 1987), professional basketball player from East Tennessee State University
- Mike Smith (basketball, born 1997), college basketball player for the Michigan Wolverines

=== Cricket ===
- M. J. K. Smith (1933–2026), English cricketer and rugby union player
- Michael J. Smith (cricketer) (1942–2004), cricketer who played for Middlesex CCC and England
- Mike Smith (Australian cricketer) (born 1973)
- Mike Smith (Scottish cricketer) (1966–2026)
- Mike Smith (cricketer, born 1967), Gloucestershire CCC and England cricketer
- Michael Smith (Oxfordshire cricketer) (1928–2018), English cricketer
- Michael Smith (South African cricketer) (born 1980)

=== Other sports ===
- Michael Smith (Australian footballer) (born 1959), Australian rules footballer
- Michael Smith (rugby league, born c. 1947), in the 1960s, and 1970s for Featherstone Rovers and Huddersfield
- Mike Smith (rugby league), in the 1970s, and 1980s for Great Britain and Hull Kingston Rovers
- Michael Smith (rugby league, born 1976), in the 1990s and 2000s for North Harbour, New Zealand, Canterbury Bulldogs
- Michael Smith (rugby union) (born 1998), Canadian rugby union player
- Mike Smith (rugby union) (born 1945), Scottish rugby union player
- Michael Smith (ice hockey) (born 1971), Canadian ice hockey defenseman
- Mike Smith (ice hockey, born 1945), general manager for Winnipeg Jets and Chicago Blackhawks
- Mike Smith (ice hockey, born 1982), Canadian goaltender for the Edmonton Oilers
- Michael Smith (wrestler) (born 1963), American professional wrestler
- Mike E. Smith (born 1965), American jockey
- Mike Smith (decathlete) (born 1967), Canadian decathlete
- Michael Smith (darts player) (born 1990), English darts player
- Michael Smith (canoeist), British slalom canoeist
- Mike Smith (softball), head coach of the California Baptist Lancers softball team
- Mike Smith (running coach) (born 1980), cross country and track and field coach for the Northern Arizona Lumberjacks
- Mike Smith (skateboarder), American skateboarder
- Mike Smith (tennis) (born 1962), American tennis player
- Michael Smith (sprinter), winner of the 2002 4 × 400 meter relay at the NCAA Division I Indoor Track and Field Championships

== Others ==
- Michael Smith (judge) (1740–1809), Irish judge
- Michael Babington Smith (1901–1984), British banker, sportsman, and soldier
- Mike Sharwood Smith (born 1942), British linguist
- Michael John Smith (espionage) (born 1948), British Cold War spy
- Michael A. Smith (philosopher) (born 1954), philosopher at Princeton University
- Michael S. Smith (interior designer) (born 1964), American interior designer
- Michael Acton Smith (born 1974), CEO of Mind Candy
- Michael S. Smith II, counter-terrorism advisor to members of the US Congress
- Michael J. Smith, U.S. army sergeant, dog handler convicted for prisoner abuse at Abu Ghraib prison
- Michael Smith (police officer), police sergeant killed during the 2016 shooting of Dallas police officers
- Michael Smith (aviator) (born 1968), Australian aviator
- Michael Smith (natural gas industry), founder, chairman, and CEO of Freeport LNG
- Michael Daniel Smith (1991–1994), three-year-old boy murdered by his mother Susan Smith
- Michael Dewayne Smith (1982–2024), convicted murderer executed in Oklahoma
- Michael Holroyd Smith (1847–1932), British pioneer of electrical and motor car engineering

== See also ==
- Michael Smyth (disambiguation)
- Mickey Smith (disambiguation)
