= Nagao Kita =

Japanese diplomat (1895–1947)

- 喜多 長雄
- Kita in 1941

Consul General of Japan in Honolulu
- In office March 1941 – December 1941
- Preceded by: Kiichi Gunji

Consul General of Japan in Canton
- In office October 1939 – 1940

Personal details
- Born: March 13, 1895
- Died: May 1947 (aged 52)
- Alma mater: Tokyo Imperial University
- Occupation: Diplomat

Nagao Kita (喜多 長雄, Kita Nagao; March 13, 1895 – May 1947) was a Japanese diplomat who served as consul general in Honolulu in the months before the attack on Pearl Harbor. A career foreign service office, Kita publicly argued that war with the United States was not a threat while secretly reporting on American troop movements and acting as an intelligence handler for the Japanese government. After the attack, Kita and his staff were detained and later repatriated to Japan in a wartime exchange.

== Early life and career ==
Kita was born on March 13, 1895. He graduated from the Tokyo Imperial University in 1923 and entered Japan's foreign service shortly thereafter. Kita joined Japan's foreign service in 1923. He served overseas in London, Shanghai, and Amoy. In October 1939 he was named Consul-General of Japan's consulate in Canton. On December 20, 1940, he was made Consul-General for Hawaii, replacing Kiichi Gunji. He arrived in Hawaii in March 1941. While serving in Hawaii, he consistently made public statements opposed to war with the United States.

== Wartime espionage activities ==
While working in Hawaii, Kita consistently provided intelligence about American troop movements to the government of Japan. He also operated as an intelligence handler for Japanese spies, including Takeo Yoshikawa, whose cover was as the vice-consul responsible for helping Japanese-Americans renounce their Japanese citizenship. Kita was initially the only person in Hawaii who knew of Yoshikawa's real identity as a spy. Eventually, however, Kita ordered Yoshikawa to collaborate with Bernard Julius Otto Kuehn, a German spy assisting the Japanese.

On March 22, 1941, Kita was explicitly ordered to document the movements of the United States Fleet as it operated around Pearl Harbor. He did so and, despite his messages being intercepted by American intelligence, he was allowed to continue living and operating in Hawaii. On September 24, he was instructed by his superiors to provide a report containing the exact number of warships currently moored at Pearl Harbor. The instructions divided Pearl Harbor into multiple zones and Kita was told to identify the number of ships in each zone. Kita complied with the instructions, but the message was intercepted by American agents who, unable to decipher it, had to cent the message to Washington, D.C. on a flight that only left the island once a wekk. The message did not reach the mainland until October 6 and was not translated until October 9 when it was subsequently discarded, with American intelligence not deeming the message to represent a threat.

On December 3, four days before the attack on Pearl Harbor, Kita provided the Japanese government with update information on the locations of American ships, including the USS Oklahoma, USS Nevada, and USS Enterprise. The Oklahoma and Nevada were both involved in the attack, with the former being outright destroyed. Shortly after the attacks on December 7, Kita was taken into protective custody by police and the assets of the Japanese Consulate were seized. Before being taken into custody, he and Yoshikawa were able to burn many of their code books and secret instructions. He was later removed to the mainland along with the rest of the Japanese Consulate's staff. He was held in custody in Arizona at Trangle T Guest Ranch for several months and was later deported to Japan as part of a prisoner exchange.

== Personal life ==
Kita was described by Yoshikawa as a "bluff, likeable man" who liked to drink and was friendly with many people in the Imperial Navy. He was previously married and had one son.
