= Drabkin =

Drabkin is a surname. Notable people with the surname include:

- Efim Drabkin (1928–2010), Russian writer
- Israel Edward Drabkin (1905–1965), American classicist and historian
- Ronald Drabkin, American writer, entrepreneur and angel investor
