= Day of Deceit =

1999 book by Robert Stinnett

Day of Deceit: The Truth About FDR and Pearl Harbor
- First edition
- Author: Robert Stinnett
- Subject: Pearl Harbor advance-knowledge conspiracy theory
- Publisher: Free Press, Edition: Touchstone ed
- Publication date: 1999
- Pages: 416
- ISBN: 0-7432-0129-9
- Dewey Decimal: 940.5426
- LC Class: D767.92.S837

Day of Deceit: The Truth About FDR and Pearl Harbor is a book by Robert Stinnett. It alleges that Franklin Roosevelt and his administration deliberately provoked and allowed the Japanese attack on Pearl Harbor to bring the United States into World War II. Stinnett argues that the attacking fleet was detected by radio and intelligence intercepts, but the information was deliberately withheld from Admiral Husband E. Kimmel, the commander of the Pacific Fleet at that time.

First released in December 1999, it received a nuanced review in The New York Times and is frequently referenced by proponents of advance knowledge theories.

Historians of the period, however, generally reject its thesis, pointing to several key errors and reliance on doubtful sources.

== Summary ==
Stinnett's starting point is a memorandum written by Lieutenant Commander Arthur H. McCollum in October 1940, which was obtained through the Freedom of Information Act. McCollum, then head of the Far East desk of the Office of Naval Intelligence, discussed the strategic situation in the Pacific and ended with a list of eight actions directed at the Japanese threat. Stinnett characterizes the actions as "provocations" and states his belief in McCollum's point F ("Keep the main strength of the U.S. fleet now in the Pacific in the vicinity of the Hawaiian Islands") was intended to lure the Japanese into attacking it. Stinnett asserts that the overall intent was to provoke an act of war that would allow Roosevelt to enter into active conflict with Germany in support of the United Kingdom.

Walter Short and Kimmel were ordered to remain in a defensive posture with respect to the Japanese. Stinnett claims that intelligence intercepts were deliberately withheld from them to prevent them from mounting an adequate defense. He also claims that radio traffic was intercepted from the fleet as it approached Hawaii, allowing it to be tracked, but again, the information was withheld so that the defenders would be unprepared. All, says Stinnett, was directed from the White House itself with Roosevelt's knowledge and at his behest.

== Reception ==
Reviewers were generally dismissive of Stinnett's claims, as many of his claims appear to be baseless. An article in Salon quotes CIA historian Donald Steury:

[Stinnett] concocted this theory pretty much from whole cloth. Those who have been able to check his alleged sources also are unanimous in their condemnation of his methodology. Basically, the author has made up his sources; when he does not make up the source, he lies about what the source says.

Critical points in Stinnett's argument were disputed by military historians. His characterization of the McCollum memorandum was not accepted by Conrad Crane, Chief of Historical Services and Support at the United States Army Heritage and Education Center, who wrote: "A close reading shows that its recommendations were supposed to deter and contain Japan, while better preparing the United States for a future conflict in the Pacific. There is an offhand remark that an overt Japanese act of war would make it easier to garner public support for actions against Japan, but the document's intent was not to ensure that event happened." This means that Stinnett attributes to McCollum a position McCollum expressly refuted. Furthermore, McCollum's own sworn testimony also refutes it.

Philip Zelikow, writing in Foreign Affairs, objected to Stinnett's claim that the Japanese naval code was being read at the time (the JN-25 code was changed shortly before the attack and was not decrypted again until May 1942), an objection also raised by Crane. A review posted on the U.S. Naval Cryptologic Veterans Association website addresses the intelligence issues in greater detail and disputes claims that the fleet was detected through direction finding; the author also criticizes Stinnett's use of testimony from Robert Ogg, originally identified as "Seaman Z" by John Toland in his 1986 book. Indeed, Ogg expressly denies saying what Toland quotes him as saying. In their annotations on the 1995 Pentagon study of the attack, Frederic Borch and Daniel Martinez, chief historian at the USS Arizona Memorial, also dispute these claims and call his claims "totally false".

Stinnett's claims of "intercepts" are contradicted by Japanese testimony, which unequivocally state there were none, and even transmitter keys were removed from radios of ships in the task force. (The claim of a need for "low-power radio" made by Stinnett ignores standard fleet practise under radio silence, use of flag or blinker.) Moreover, his "intercepts" do not amount to direction finding bearings, contrary to his claims, while his document allegedly showing the plot of these nonexistent bearings contains nothing of the kind.

"If there was this vast and humongous conspiracy", its members had to number in the hundreds. Among them would have to be Lt. Kermit Tyler who, on the morning of 7 December, was contacted about a radar contact on an inbound flight, and told the operators to forget about it. One would also have to include the Navy duty officer, who was asleep when the destroyer USS Ward first tried to report a minisub contact, thereby losing over three hours' warning. It would also include the officer who ordered USAAC fighters be parked in close proximity to avoid sabotage. Also included would be the senior antiaircraft officers, who ordered ammunition to be locked up far from the guns.

Furthermore, Stinnett makes numerous and contradictory claims of the number of messages originated by the Kido Butai, attributing to it messages from shore stations, Yamamoto's flagship (which was not accompanying the task force), deception measures, and traffic from before the task force even sailed. Moreover, he finds "not a single one" originating from the Kido Butai after it sortied 26 November.

David Kahn commented on the book, stating that it had "basic errors of fact" and "tendentious interpretations" and was "an extraordinarily sloppy book". Examples include Stinett commenting on Japanese code wheels which did not exist, and misreading a date that said 15-5-41 as December 5, 1941. Stinnett also mistakenly believed that provoking Japan into an act of war against another nation would trigger the mutual assistance provision of the Axis Tripartite Pact.

Historian Gordon Prange, in an earlier work, noted that a war between the U.S. and Japan was contrary to Roosevelt's desire to aid Britain in her fight against Germany, and Prime Minister Churchill's desire to avoid "another war". Prange, the foremost authority on the Pearl Harbor attack, characterizes the conspiracy theory as "an absurdity." British historian John Keegan writes that Stinnett's charges of conspiracy "defy logic", and fail to show how Roosevelt could have succeeded in bringing US Army Chief George Marshall and US Navy Chief Harold Stark into the conspiracy. Another British historian, Ronald Lewin, calls Stinnett's theory "moonshine." Military intelligence historian Roberta Wohlstetter wrote that Stinnett conflated FDR's desire for an incident which might serve as a catalyst for war against Germany, with FDR's supposed foreknowledge of such an incident provoking war with Japan. Presidential historian Joseph E. Persico found that FDR drafted an appeal to peace to the Emperor of Japan the night before the Pearl Harbor attack, which historian Hervie Haughler said could not be the action of someone who wished for war with Japan.

== Reviews ==
- Foreign Affairs, Vol. 79, No. 2 (March/April 2000). Reviewed by Philip Zelikow.
- Kirkus Reviews (October 15, 1999)
- The New York Times. (December 15, 1999) “Day of Deceit': On Dec. 7, Did We Know We Knew?”. Reviewed by Richard Bernstein.
- Baltimore Sun (November 21, 1999) "Did Roosevelt lie about Pearl Harbor?". Reviewed by Pia Nordlinger.
