= Michael Smyth =

Michael Smyth may refer to:

- Michael Smyth (journalist), Australian journalist and broadcaster
- Michael Smyth (politician) (died 1973), Irish politician
- Mickey Smyth (1921–1981), Irish trade unionist and politician

== See also ==
- Michael Smith (disambiguation)
