= Mickey Smith (disambiguation) =

Mickey Smith may refer to:

- Mickey Smith, a character from Doctor Who
- Mickey Smith (artist), American photographer and conceptual artist

== See also ==
- Michael Smith (disambiguation)
