= Arthur H. McCollum =

20th-century American naval officer

Rear Admiral Arthur Howard McCollum
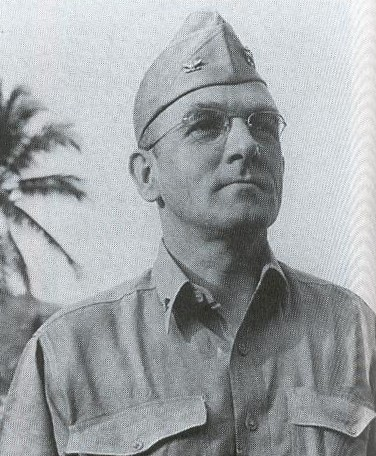
- Born: August 4, 1898; Nagasaki, Japan
- Died: April 1, 1976 (aged 77); Arlington, Virginia
- Military career
- Allegiance: United States of America
- Branch: United States Navy: Office of Naval Intelligence
- Service years: 1921–1953
- Rank: (United States Navy) Rear Admiral
- Website: http://www.usni.org/heritage/mccollum

Arthur Howard McCollum (August 4, 1898 – April 1, 1976) was an American Naval Officer as well as a key member of the Intelligence agency in the Southwest Pacific. He was born in Nagasaki, Japan to two Baptist Missionaries. He spent several years in Japan after his graduation from the Naval Academy, granting him a large amount of knowledge about East Asia and the Southwest Pacific that proved key in his interactions with Naval Intelligence.

McCollum served as an American Naval Officer and retired in 1951 as Rear Admiral and consultant after World War II to the Central Intelligence Group and Central Intelligence Agency.

Raised in Marion, Alabama, McCollum graduated from the U.S. Naval Academy in 1921 and was then sent by the Navy for 3 years of study in Japan. He was serving as an assistant naval attaché in Tokyo in 1930 when Edwin T. Layton, Joseph J. Rochefort and Ethelbert Watts Jr. were there for similar training. McCollum also attended the submarine school at the Naval Submarine Base. Despite the fact that he served on a wide variety of ships with the US Navy, he is most noted for his work in intelligence. He was fleet intelligence officer on the staff of Commander in Chief U. S. Fleet (1936-1938). In October 1940 as a Lt. Commander he authored what is called the McCollum memo outlining his assessment of German and Japanese threats to U.S. security. From Nov. 1942 to May 1945, he held 3 titles simultaneously. He held Director of Allied Naval Intelligence, Southwest Pacific, Assistant Chief of Staff for Intelligence, Seventh Fleet, and Commanding Officer of the Seventh Fleet Intelligence Center. He retired in 1951 from the US Navy. He was recalled to active duty with the CIA and retired once more in 1953.

== Intelligence work ==
McCollum, a key figure to the Office of Naval Intelligence, was the chief commander of the Far East section of ONI. He served on the staff of the Commander of the U.S Pacific Fleet as the intelligence officer from 1936 to 1938 and served several roles in intelligence from 1942 to 1945. His most notable contribution to Naval Intelligence is the McCollum memo (or Eight Action Memo) in which he provided an eight step plan to provoke Japan into attacking the United States. McCollum was also the Distribution Officer for intercepted Japanese diplomatic intelligence (MAGIC). The military code, JN-25, had not yet been broken.

Promoted to captain effective June 20, 1942, he was advanced to rear admiral on the retired list when he left active duty in June 1951.

== Personal ==
McCollum and his wife Margaret Benninghoff McCollum (December 3, 1901 – February 20, 1985) were buried at Arlington National Cemetery.
