= Ray Sturtivant =

British military writer (1926–2008)

Raymond Cecil Sturtivant ISO (26 July 1926 – 9 August 2008) was a British aviation historian and author.

== Early life ==
Ray Sturtivant was born in Nottingham. He spent his National Service in the RAF (Royal Air Force), but was given a desk job in India at the end of World War II, with poor eyesight that thwarted his ambition of becoming a pilot. That led to a long career in the Civil Service.

== Professional life ==
In 1948, Sturtivant joined the Civil Service at Nottingham County Court, with further similar posts at Sheffield, and Kingston upon Hull. He became chief clerk at Carlisle County Court, then at Willesden County Court, and then Bow, London County Court. He wrote the Bailiffs Manual, (1980) that was judged to be an invaluable resource. Within the Inland Revenue, he was responsible for 300 probate offices in the UK. In 1984 he was appointed Establishment Officer of the Principal Registry of the Family Division at Somerset House.

In 1986 he retired from the Civil Service. In 1987 he was awarded an ISO (Companion of the Imperial Service Order), a prestigious award, but now no longer awarded. His ISO honour was presented to him by Queen Elizabeth II at Buckingham Palace.

== Life as historian and author ==
From childhood, Sturtivant's principal and passion was aircraft and aviation. While an Air Cadet, he pursued his interest in recording aviation activities while cycling around pre-war and wartime airfields around Nottinghamshire. He developed a prolific skill for record-keeping and detail, and started writing for magazines such as Flight and Aviation News. In 1978 he wrote his first aviation book, 'Royal Navy Instructional Airframes', followed 1982 by 'Fleet Air Arm at War'. Further books followed at an average of one per year, including 'The Camel File', 'The Swordfish Story', 'The Anson File'. His most important work was probably 'The Squadrons of the Fleet Air Arm'; written with Theo Ballance, this book detailed all the FAA Squadron histories, and widely regarded as the definitive book on the subject. In 1995, a specially bound copy of 'The Squadrons of the Fleet Air Arm', was presented to HRH Prince Philip, Duke of Edinburgh at the Fleet Air Arm Museum at Yeovilton, when the Prince retired as President of the Museum.

In later years he expanded his range of books to include 'The SE5 File', The 'DH4/DH9 File', and 'Spitfire International'. One of his last books, co-authored with Henry Boot, was 'Gifts of War: Spitfires and other Presentation Aircraft in Two World Wars', covering the subject of wartime aircraft that were funded by donations from individuals, groups, private companies, towns, and nations. Many of his books were published by the historical aviation society Air-Britain, of which he had been a member since 1948, and for which he served many years as a member of the governing council.

== Family life ==
He married Doreen, and had a daughter Yvonne and son Geoffrey.
