= Robert Stinnett =

American sailor and writer (1924–2018)

Robert B. Stinnett (March 31, 1924 – November 6, 2018) was an American sailor, photographer and author. He earned ten battle stars and a Presidential Unit Citation. He was the author of Day of Deceit, regarding alleged U.S. government advance knowledge of the Japanese Attack on Pearl Harbor, plunging the United States into World War II.

== Life ==
Stinnett participated in World War II from 1942 to 1946 as a naval photographer in the Pacific theater, serving in the same aerial photo group as George H. W. Bush. After the war he worked as a journalist and photographer for the Oakland Tribune. He resigned from the Tribune in 1986 to research and write.

Stinnett was a research fellow at the Independent Institute in Oakland, California. He died on November 6, 2018, aged 94.

== Day of Deceit ==
In 1982 Stinnett read At Dawn We Slept: The Untold Story of Pearl Harbor by World War II veteran and historian Gordon Prange. Stinnett went to Pearl Harbor to investigate and write a news story. His research continued for 17 years and culminated in Day of Deceit, which challenges the orthodox historiography on the attack on Pearl Harbor. Stinnett claimed to have found information showing that the attacking fleet was detected through radio and intelligence intercepts, but that the information was deliberately withheld from Admiral Kimmel, the commander of the base.

First released in December 1999, it received a nuanced review in The New York Times and is frequently referenced by proponents of advance knowledge conspiracy theories. Many historians of the period reject its thesis, pointing to what they believe are several key errors and a reliance on doubtful sources.

== The Play ==
In 1982 Stinnett was working as a sports photographer for the Oakland Tribune. With four seconds left in that year's "Big Game" between the Cal and Stanford football teams, Stinnett stationed himself behind the south end zone at Berkeley's California Memorial Stadium. As it happened, Cal's Kevin Moen and teammates Dwight Garner, Richard Rodgers, and Mariet Ford pulled off "The Play", in which Moen fielded the Stanford kickoff, lateraled the ball, and five laterals later, received the final lateral, which he ran into the end zone through the Stanford Band. Stinnett was in perfect position for a famous photographic shot wherein Moen is on the zenith point of his leap, roaring in triumph, the football held high over his helmet, and about to land on Stanford trombone player Gary Tyrell.

== Bibliography ==
- George Bush: His World War II Years (Brassey's, 1992) ISBN 9780028810430
- Day of Deceit: The Truth About FDR and Pearl Harbor (Simon and Schuster, 1999) ISBN 9780743200370

== See also ==
- McCollum memo
