= Ronald Drabkin =

Tokyo-based American writer

- Born: Los Angeles, California
- Education: Duke University; University of California, Berkeley

Ron Drabkin is an American writer, entrepreneur, and angel investor. Based in Tokyo, he is the author of Beverly Hills Spy: The Double-Agent War Hero Who Helped Japan Attack Pearl Harbor and Admiral Yamamoto.

== Early life and education ==
Drabkin grew up on the Westside of Los Angeles. He graduated from Duke University and attended International Christian University in Mitaka, Japan prior to earning an MBA at UC Berkeley.

== Career ==
Drabkin began his career in Silicon Valley. He commuted between the US and Japan before moving to Tokyo to work for an education start-up. In 2017, following his father's death, Drabkin discovered that both his father and grandfather had backgrounds in counterintelligence.

Intending to write about his family history, he requested files from the FBI on Frederick Rutland, who he suspected was an associate of his grandfather's. The file on Rutland, a British pilot and war hero who had become a spy for the Japanese Navy, had just been declassified. Drabkin, who said he may have been the first person outside of the bureau to see Rutland's FBI files, decided to write about him after reading his story. He conducted research in the United States, Japan, and the UK.

Initially, he published his new research in a couple of peer reviewed academic journals.

His book about Rutland, Beverly Hills Spy: The Double-Agent War Hero Who Helped Japan Attack Pearl Harbor, was published by Harper-Collins in February 2024.

In the research for his first book, Drabkin became interested in Japan's Admiral Isoroku Yamamoto and the relatively limited amount of information in English on him. In investigating, he discovered that significant new information on Yamamoto had come to light in the last 15 years that told a rather different version of Yamamoto than is depicted in the movies. His research was enhanced by his mentorship from two prominent Japanese history professors, and he was able to interview the descendants of three Japanese admirals. His follow on book, Admiral Yamamoto, will be published by Tuttle Publishing in November 2026.
