= Itaru Tachibana =

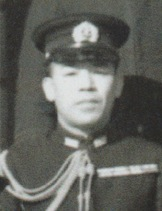
Itaru Tachibana

Itaru Tachibana (立花 止, Tachibana Itaru; 1903-1954) was a Japanese spy active in the United States.

USC PhD student Pedro Loureiro wrote that Tachibana's arrest by agents of the Federal Bureau of Investigation (FBI) "became the most publicized and sensational Japanese espionage case in the United States during 1941."

== Education and training ==
Tachibana graduated from the Japanese Naval Academy and the Japanese Naval War College. He held the position of commander in the Navy of Japan. In 1933 he boarded a training ship and visited the United States for the first time. In 1940 he did academic studies at the University of Southern California (USC), studying the foreign policy and history of the United States. He stayed in Los Angeles after that working in espionage. Loureiro wrote that "Tachibana had little training or experience in intelligence".

== Espionage ==
Tachibana began attending the university in September 1940. He received the rank of commander from the Japanese authorities in December of that year. His studies at USC ended in February 1941.

Tachibana collected information about U.S. military installations on the West Coast; the ONI later determined 70% of the information collected was already publicly available. Tachibana himself stated that he did not experience difficulty collecting information since "the United States up to the very last operated on a peacetime basis with practically no restrictions on communications and the like." He asked nisei (second-generation Japanese American) women to be with him on trips to lower suspicions from outside parties; he never informed them of the true reasons he took the trips.

The Eleventh Naval District (11ND) was based in San Diego, California.

== Counterintelligence, prosecution, and departure ==
Office of Naval Intelligence (ONI) employee Henry Claiborne, a lieutenant in the Navy, in early June of that year, gave notice to the Los Angeles office of the Federal Bureau of Investigation (FBI) that the ONI had begun monitoring Tachibana as the agency believed that he was acting as a foreign agent for Japan; the FBI chose not to open its own investigation while the ONI investigated. 11ND's district intelligence office also opened an investigation on Tachibana as it was suspecting he was trying to damage U.S. naval operations. Loureiro wrote that this office "directed and carried out most of the counterintelligence operations."

Initially the FBI was hesitant to pursue prosecution due to diplomatic issues as Tachibana was a known affiliate of the Japanese government. The ONI asked the FBI to reconsider when the ONI believed that Tachibana may leave the United States. Ultimately the FBI agreed to pursue prosecution, and the Department of State authorized Tachibana's prosecution. The FBI arrested Tachibana at the Olympic Hotel, where he was living. The Japanese Navy paid Tachibana's bail money. The FBI counted 107 pages of evidence that it had collected from the hotel room. The files seized from Tachibana's hotel room also contained evidence implicating Charlie Chaplin's ex secretary Toraichi Kono, British war hero Frederick Rutland, and other Japanese attachés such as Sadatomo Okada.

The Embassy of Japan in Washington, DC, on June 9, 1941, received a complaint from the government of Japan about the arrest. The State Department, wishing to preserve Japan-United States relations, ultimately asked the United States attorney to not pursue prosecution so long as Tachibana left the country. He boarded the Nitta Maru on June 21 in San Francisco, which U.S. government officials forced him to do, and set sail for Japan.

== Aftermath ==
In September 1941 he entered the Third Bureau of the Japanese Navy, which handled intelligence matters. The High Command of the Navy assigned Tachibana to the group that managed the attack on Pearl Harbor in December 1941; according to Loureiro, what he learned about the U.S. Navy "was an important factor" in his placement.

Loureiro wrote that the Tachibana arrest "effectively" ended the Southern California Japanese naval spy ring and taught U.S. authorities the Japanese Navy's contacts and what information the Japanese Navy desired.
