= Takeo Yoshikawa =

Japanese naval officer and spy (1912–1993)

- Native name: 吉川 猛夫
- Born: March 7, 1912; Matsuyama, Ehime Prefecture, Empire of Japan
- Died: February 20, 1993 (aged 80) Japan
- Allegiance: Empire of Japan
- Branch: Imperial Japanese Navy; Naval Intelligence
- Service years: 1933–1936 (Naval); 1937–1945 (Intelligence)
- Rank: Ensign
- Conflicts: World War II: Attack on Pearl Harbor (as spy)

Takeo Yoshikawa (吉川 猛夫, Yoshikawa Takeo; March 7, 1912 – February 20, 1993) was a Japanese spy in Hawaii before the attack on Pearl Harbor on December 7, 1941.

== Early career ==
A 1933 graduate of the Imperial Japanese Naval Academy at Etajima (graduating 92nd out of 116 cadets), Yoshikawa served briefly at sea aboard the armored cruiser Asama as well as submarines. He had begun training as a naval pilot near the end of 1934 when a severe stomach ailment prevented his completing his training. He was subsequently discharged from the Imperial Japanese Navy in 1936. As a result, he briefly contemplated suicide.

A year later he began a career in Naval intelligence, being assigned to Navy Headquarters in Tokyo. He became an expert regarding the U.S. Navy, perusing every source he could possibly get his hands on. While on intelligence duty he intercepted a shortwave radio message in plain English that 17 troop transports were en route to England, having cleared the port of Freetown, Sierra Leone. He passed this information to the German Embassy, and many of the ships were destroyed as a result. Yoshikawa subsequently received a personal letter of thanks from Adolf Hitler. In 1940 he became a junior diplomat after passing the Foreign Ministry English examinations.

== A spy in Hawaii ==
Because of his expertise on the U.S. Navy, Yoshikawa was sent to Hawaii posing as a vice-consul named Tadashi Morimura (森村 正 Morimura Tadashi), arriving on March 27, 1941, with Nagao Kita (喜多 長雄 Kita Nagao), the new Japanese Consul-General, aboard the liner Nitta Maru. He rented a second-story apartment that overlooked Pearl Harbor and would often wander around the island of Oahu, taking notes on fleet movements and security measures. He rented small airplanes at John Rodgers Airport and flew around, observing U.S. installations; he also dove under the harbor using a hollow reed as a breathing device. He gathered information by taking the Navy's own harbor tugboat and listening to local gossip. He worked closely with German Abwehr agent Bernard Kuehn, as well as another former Etajima graduate, Kokichi Seki (関 興吉 Seki Kō'kichi), an untrained spy who served as the consulate's treasurer.

According to Yoshikawa, although some 160,000 persons of Japanese ancestry lived in Hawaii at that time, he never tried to make use of this resource in his espionage activities. He and Seki agreed that, while Hawaii should be the "easiest place" to carry out such work in view of the large Japanese population, both looked upon the locals with disdain. "[T]hose men of influence and character who might have assisted me in my secret mission were unanimously uncooperative...." Instead he made "regular use of a Japanese-American military veteran, a driver in the employ of the consulate general for over 20 years, whom he valued for his being “trusted by the Americans.” Another Japanese-American working at the consulate general bought at least one airplane ticket in his own name for Yoshikawa, who wished to avoid suspicion by buying too many tickets himself. He also turned often to a favorite taxi driver, an immigrant with Japanese military experience, who on at least one occasion hid his taxi outside the consulate general to help Yoshikawa avoid surveillance at the beginning of his route."

Although he had no knowledge of a planned attack on Naval Station Pearl Harbor, Yoshikawa assumed that the intelligence would help prepare for such an eventuality and worked tirelessly to that end. His reports were transmitted by the Japanese consulate in PURPLE code to the Foreign Ministry, which passed them on to the Navy. Although the code had been broken by Allied codebreakers and messages to and from Tokyo were intercepted and decrypted, communications between Tokyo and the consulate were considered low-priority because they contained so many messages that were entirely commercial in nature. However, one such message addressed to Kita (but actually to Yoshikawa) and sent on September 24, 1941, should have received more attention. It divided Pearl Harbor into five distinct zones and requested that the location and number of warships be indicated on a "plot" (i.e., grid) of the harbor. However, due to delays caused by staff shortages and other priorities the message was not decrypted and distributed until mid-October, and then dismissed as being of little consequence. However, it was the reports that he sent twice a week based on this request that enabled Admiral Isoroku Yamamoto to finalize his plan for the attack.

When he heard the "East wind, rain" code phrase on the short wave radio bringing the news from Tokyo to signal that an attack against the United States was to proceed, Yoshikawa destroyed all evidence of his activities. When the FBI picked him up on the day of the attack, there was no incriminating evidence of his espionage. He eventually returned to Japan in August 1942 in a diplomat prisoner exchange. It was not known for some time that he was the chief Japanese agent in Hawaii.

== Return to Japan and later life ==
Yoshikawa continued to work for naval intelligence during the remainder of the war. When the war ended and Japan was occupied by U.S. forces, he went into hiding (disguised as a Buddhist monk) for fear of being prosecuted for his role in the Pearl Harbor attack. He returned to his wife (whom he had married shortly after his return from the U.S.) when the occupation ended.

Yoshikawa never received official recognition of his services during the war. In 1955, he opened a candy business but it failed as word spread of his role in the war. The locals blamed Yoshikawa for the war. "They even blamed me for the atomic bomb," he declared in one interview. Penniless and jobless, he was supported by his wife for the rest of his life via her position selling insurance. "My wife alone shows me great respect," said the old former spy. "Every day she bows to me. She knows I am a man of history." He died in a nursing home.

Over the years, the mysterious spies of Pearl Harbor were always mentioned in passing in history books. While the Yoshikawa case was used to retroactively justify the decision to intern Japanese Americans, he claimed that he distrusted the Japanese-American community and that it was loyal to America over Japan.

In 1963 Yoshikawa authored an account of his life and especially his intelligence work on Oahu in 1941. In 2020 his memoir was translated into English.
