= Michael John Smith (spy) =

British engineer convicted of espionage

Michael John Smith (born on 22 September 1948) was convicted of spying in the UK.

In 1992, Smith was arrested, accused of spying for the KGB, and charged with four offences under sections 1(1)(b) and (c) of the UK Official Secrets Act 1911. Smith was convicted on the three section 1(1)(c) charges relating to "communicating material to another for a purpose prejudicial to the safety or interests of the State". He was sentenced to 25 years in prison, reduced in June 1995 on appeal to 20 years.

Christopher Andrew, in his history of the KGB, described Smith as "probably the most important British Line X agent since the retirement of (Melita) Norwood".

== Education ==
Between 1960 and 1967, Smith attended Ockendon Courts County Secondary Modern School in Essex and gained nine GCE 'O' levels and four 'A' levels. He went on to the University of Surrey where he graduated in 1971 with a degree in electronic and electrical engineering.

== Early politics ==
Smith joined the Communist Party of Great Britain in 1972. In 1975, he became the secretary of the Kingston branch of the Young Communist League.

== Employment ==
After graduating, Smith found employment for a short time as a trainee assistant electronic engineer at a small engineering company. In April 1972, he joined Rediffusion in Chessington as a junior engineer.

In July 1976, he started work as a test engineer in the quality assurance department of Thorn EMI Defence Electronics at Feltham, Middlesex. As a part of this role he had security clearance to allow him access to material classified up to SECRET.

From 1985 to 31 July 1992, when he was made redundant, he was a quality audit manager at the Hirst Research Centre, Wembley, the central research laboratory of General Electric Company (GEC), which undertook a wide range of Ministry of Defence (MoD) and commercial projects. Since at least 1977, it had been a "prohibited place" under Section 3(b) of the Official Secrets Act 1911 because it held classified material for the purpose of fulfilling MoD contracts. These contracts covered a range of military equipment, including the Rapier missile.

== Espionage ==
The prosecutors alleged that Smith was recruited as a spy by Colonel Viktor Oshchenko (Russian: Виктор Ощенко), a KGB Line X officer, who befriended him at a union meeting in 1975 and ran him until September 1979. In court, the prosecution offered no evidence to support this allegation.

Oshchenko defected in July 1992 and provided information that is said to have confirmed suspicions that Smith had provided information on the XN-715 radar fuse for the British WE.177 free-fall nuclear bomb. The fuse was developed by Thorn EMI in conjunction with a number of MoD research establishments.

Despite the fact that the most serious alleged espionage occurred whilst he was working for EMI, the trial was confined to charges relating to documents taken from GEC in his possession at the time of his arrest.

== Arrest ==
By the time of Oshchenko's defection, Smith was no longer working for a defence contractor. The Security Service, MI5, gave him the code name Parellic and placed him under surveillance. Given the information provided by Oshchenko after his defection it was decided to arrest Smith as soon as possible. In August 1992, a member of the Security Service telephoned him pretending to be a friend of Oshchenko and suggested that they should meet. It was arranged to call Smith at a telephone kiosk near his home. The call did not take place due to a mix up, but Smith was under surveillance by the Metropolitan Police near the kiosk. When Smith returned home he was arrested.

Analysis of Smith's financial affairs revealed unexplained income of over £20,000. Smith claims this was from his contact "Harry" for industrial espionage.

During a search of the boot of his car, police found a plastic bag full of documents and some components. Among the documents were handwritten notes headed "Micromachining Project" and "Micron-Valve Project", and a document that an expert (Professor Lewis) at the trial linked to the ALARM anti-radiation missile project.

== Damage assessment ==
The report of the Security Commission dated July 1995, prepared after an inquiry into the case, stated that,

"The material known to have been obtained by Smith during his time at GEC which led to the charges and his conviction under the Official Secrets Act, was a mixed bag. Some was already in the public domain and some was of value more for its commercial than for its military potential. But a number of documents contained more sensitive material, relating to weapons systems. The potential damage to the UK overall including the Rapier is assessed as considerable. In the case of the other current weapon system, the detailed information contained in the document which should have been classified SECRET would have enabled an intelligent enemy to deduce operating parameters which would have allowed counter-measures to be developed. The potential damage to the national interest in the case of that weapons system is assessed as serious."

== Follow-ups ==
On 10 January 2006, Andrew Mackinlay MP asked in Parliament for clarification as to which weapon system the most serious document in the prosecution was linked. Smith alleges that this document had nothing to do with ALARM, as alleged in his trial.
