= Michael Smith (author) =

Michael Smith is a British author and journalist specialising in the history of polar exploration.

== Life and work ==
Michael Smith was born in 1946 and raised in London.

Michael Smith's first book, An Unsung Hero - Tom Crean was a notable success when first published in 2000 and became the No 1 best-selling non-fiction book in Ireland. The biography of Tom Crean was responsible for raising awareness of the role played by Irishmen in the history of Polar exploration. A subsequent adaptation of the book for children (Tom Crean - Iceman) led to the story of Tom Crean being included on the national curriculum in Irish schools.

Michael Smith has also written biographies of Captain Lawrence Oates, Sir James Wordie and Francis Crozier. He also chronicled the role of lesser known Irish explorers, including Edward Bransfield, Patrick Keohane, Robert Forde and Tim and Mortimer McCarthy.

Michael Smith's biography of Sir Ernest Shackleton was published in October 2014.

Michael Smith has appeared in a number of television factual documentaries. He also wrote and presented a series about Irish explorers for RTE Radio. Michael Smith has lectured extensively and discussed the lives of significant figures in Polar history such as Tom Crean, Francis Crozier and Ernest Shackleton. He appeared at many prestigious venues including: Queen’s Gallery Buckingham Palace London; National Library of Ireland; National Maritime Museum London; National Museum of Ireland; Princess Grace Memorial Library Monaco; Royal Geographical Society London; Royal Scottish Geographical Society; Royal Society of Edinburgh; Scott Polar Research Institute Cambridge; Cork Literacy Society; Dundee Heritage Trust; National Maritime Museum Cornwall; Brooklands Museum; Ashridge Circle Eastbourne; White-Oates Museum Selbourne; Stables Theatre Hastings; Seamus Ennis Cultural Centre.

Smith began writing about Antarctic and Arctic exploration after a successful career as an award-winning journalist in London. He was twice named Industrial Journalist of the Year (1987 and 1992). He is a Life Member of the National Union of Journalists.

From 1978–1989, Smith worked at The Guardian as an industrial editor, political correspondent and transport editor. From 1990–91 he worked at The Standard as a city editor. From 1992–95 he worked at The Observer (1992–95) as industrial editor and business editor.

== Books ==
- An Unsung Hero – Tom Crean (The Collins Press; Gill; Hodder Headline; The Mountaineers Press; Mare; Capitan Swing;), 2000 ISBN 978-0898868708
- An Unsung Hero – Tom Crean (Gill; Mareverlag; Capitan Swing) 2020 ISBN 978-0-7171 8956 4
- I Am Just Going Outside – Captain Oates – Antarctic Tragedy (The Collins Press; Spellmount) 2002 ISBN 1903464129[5]
- Polar Crusader – A Life of Sir James Wordie (Birlinn) 2004 ISBN 978 1 84158 543 7
- Tom Crean – An Illustrated Life (The Collins Press) 2006 ISBN 9781848891197
- Captain Francis Crozier - Last Man Standing? (The Collins Press) 2006 ISBN 978 184889-193-7
- Great Endeavour – Ireland's Antarctic Explorers (The Collins Press) 2008 ISBN 9781848890237
- Shackleton - By Endurance We Conquer (The Collins Press and Oneworld Publications) 2014 ISBN 978-1780745725
- Icebound in the Arctic – The Mystery of Capain Francis Crozier and the Franklin Expedition (O’Brien Press) 2021 ISBN 978-1-78849-232-4
- Tom Crean – Irish Antarctic Hero (O’Brien Press) 2025 ISBN 978-1-78849-455-7

=== Children's books ===
- Tom Crean – Iceman (The Collins Press) 2003 ISBN 1-905172-31-1
- Shackleton – The Boss (The Collins Press) 2004 ISBN 1-905172-27-3

=== Contributory author ===
- Shackleton – The Antarctic and Endurance (Dulwich College) 2001 ISBN 0-9539493-0-3
