= Kuehn family =

Family of spies

Bernard Kuehn mugshot, 1941

Bernard Julius Otto Kühn (sometimes referred to as Kuhn, German spelling with umlaut: "Kühn") (1894 or 95 – 1956) and his family were spies in the employ of the Abwehr for Nazi Germany who had close ties to Propaganda Minister Joseph Goebbels. In 1935, Goebbels offered Kuehn a job working for Japanese intelligence in Hawaii; he accepted and moved his family to Honolulu on August 15, 1935. The family included Dr. Kühn, 41 years old; his wife, Friedel; a daughter, Susie Ruth (at 17, she was the former mistress of Goebbels); and her half-brother, Hans Joachim. Goebbels sent the family to Hawaii because he discovered Ruth was half Jewish. Since all four members of the family were involved in the espionage they were dubbed the "8 eyed spy". They also had a son named Eberhard.

His daughter dated U.S. military personnel and opened a beauty parlor that offered the best and cheapest services in the city. Wives of high-ranking military personnel would spend hours gossiping about the comings and goings of their husbands. "They talked so much," she would later say, "that it was a relief when they left the place".

Bernard took his son Hans on drives so that he could count the warships and planes. He also built a dormer window in their house high over Pearl Harbor and bought high powered binoculars to monitor the US forces.

His wife's job was to record all intelligence that the family obtained.

When Japanese master spy Takeo Yoshikawa arrived in Honolulu, Dr. Kuehn would flash coded messages with a bright light from the attic of the Kuehn household—a system that went undetected until the end.

Bernard Kuehn would send coded messages to Japanese consulates. A Japanese agent claimed that Bernard lacked spying skill and was not made for the job offered by Goebbels. He would engage in his spying activities even when he was at risk of getting caught. The information that Kuehn gave the Japanese was not of great value.

The Kuehns were on the radar of the FBI for years. The FBI knew they were making frequent trips to Japan, that they often hosted Japanese visitors and that they were accepting cash from the Japanese. Lacking sufficient evidence though, the FBI never arrested the Kuehns before the attack on Pearl Harbor. They were still sending coded information to the Japanese army, as they watched the carnage from their cottage that overlooked Pearl Harbor.

On the day of the attack, martial law was declared and the FBI moved to detain everyone on their watch list, including the Kuehns. Otto and Friedel were arrested that night - Friedel was found with $5,000 taped to her body. Ruth, who was by then married, was also detained from her house and $2,000 was found sown into her curtains. Their son Eberhard was also arrested, though he was 16 and knew nothing of his family's spying.

The US found notes about the signaling system Otto was using to tell the Japanese about ship movements in the papers the Japanese were trying to burn when the US took over their consulate. They interrogated Otto and got a full confession. Friedel and Ruth never admitted to anything. Otto was tried by court martial starting on February 19, 1942 (a little over 2 months after the attack). On February 21, 1942, he was sentenced by a military commission to be shot "by musketry" as a spy. However, because it was unclear whether a verdict from a court martial hearing for spying activities that occurred during peace time was valid, the Hawaii military governor commuted Otto's sentence to 50 years in prison with hard labor. On June 6, 1946, Kuehn's sentence was further commuted so he could be deported. He was confined at Ellis Island until July 29, 1948. On December 3, 1948, Kuehn was voluntarily deported to Buenos Aires, Argentina. He returned to Germany in 1955, where he died from cancer in 1956, at the age of 61. Friedel Kuehn and Susie Kuehn were both interned for the remainder of the war, and deported to Germany in 1945. Hans was repatriated with his mother.

Eberhard considered himself American and refused to go back to Germany. He graduated from high school in Hawaii in 1944, joined the US Army, fought on Okinawa, and was awarded a Bronze Star. His daughter, Christine, wrote a book about the family called Family of Spies in 2025. She married a man named Burkhard and lives in Maryland and they had three children. She was the focus of a story about the Kuehn family featured on CBS News Sunday Morning on December 7, 2025.

Dr. Bernhard L. Hormann, the head of the sociology department at the University of Hawaii, kept a collection of the Kuehn family papers including the correspondences they wrote to one another during and after their internment in the Hawaiian Island Detention Camp on Sand Island. Dr. Hormann's family provided a home for Hans Joachim Kuehn during his parents' incarceration and subsequent sentence. His entire collection was donated to the university archives in 1981.
