= World War I cryptography =

With the rise of easily intercepted wireless telegraphy, codes and ciphers were used extensively in World War I. The decoding by British Naval intelligence of the Zimmermann telegram helped bring the United States into the war.

Trench codes were used by field armies of most of the combatants (Americans, British, French, German) in World War I.

The most commonly used codes were simple substitution ciphers. More important messages generally used mathematical encryption for extra security. The use of these codes required the distribution of codebooks to military personnel, which proved to be a security liability since these books could be stolen by enemy forces.

== Britain ==
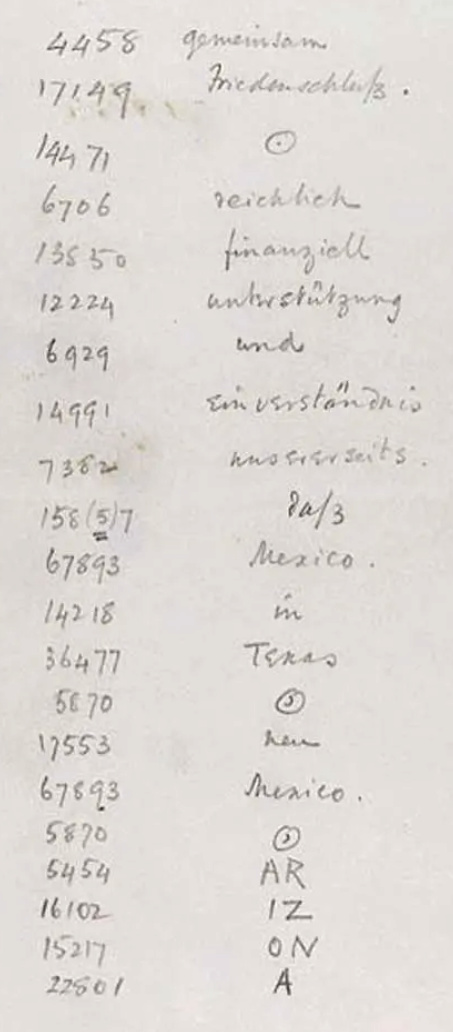
Zimmermann telegram as decoded by Room 40

British decrypting was carried out in Room 40 by the Royal Navy and in MI1 by British Military (Army) Intelligence.

- Zimmermann telegram
- Room 40 Royal Navy (Britain)
  - Alastair Denniston Room 40
  - James Alfred Ewing Room 40, first head
  - Nigel de Grey Room 40
  - William R. Hall ‘Blinker’ Hall, Room 40, second head
  - Dilly Knox Room 40
  - William Montgomery (cryptographer) Room 40
- MI1 British Military (Army) Intelligence
  - Malcolm Vivian Hay, MI1(b), head from 1915
  - Oliver Strachey MI1
- Playfair cipher

== Russia ==
- In the 1914 Battle of Tannenberg, different corps of the Russian Imperial army were unable to decipher each other's messages, so they sent them in plain text. They were easily intercepted. Meanwhile, German cryptanalysts were also able to read the enciphered ones.
- Ernst Fetterlein was in the Tsarist Russian Ministry of Foreign Affairs from 1896 and solved (among others) German, Austrian and British codes. He became chief cryptographer with the rank of admiral. With the Russian Revolution in 1917 he fled to Britain and was recruited to Room 40 in June 1918 to work on Austrian, Bolshevik and Georgian codes.
- The Russians used an overcomplicated version of the Vigenère Cipher. It was broken within three days by Austro-Hungarian cryptanalyst Hermann Pokorny.

== France ==
The French Army employed Georges Painvin, and Étienne Bazeries who came out of retirement, on German ciphers. Due to their prewar activities, the French were more prepared than any other nation involved in the war to decode German radiograms. At the beginning of the war, France had eight intercept stations: Maubeuge, Verdun, Toul, Epinal, Belfort, Lille, Rheims, and Besançon. During the war, they set up many more stations, including one in the Eiffel Tower. According to Colonel Cartier of the War Ministry, France intercepted over 100,000,000 words from German radiograms during the course of the war.

- The Tableau de Concordance was the main French diplomatic cipher.

== Germany and Austria-Hungary ==
The Imperial German Army and the Austro-Hungarian Army intercepted Russian radio communications traffic, although German success at the Battle of Tannenberg (1914) was due to interception of messages between the Imperial Russian Army commanders in cleartext.

The German Abhorchdienst, a code-breaking bureau composed mainly of mathematicians, was established in 1916.

The Germans had specific regulations regarding which kinds of codes and ciphers could be used under given circumstances. Within three kilometers of the front lines, known as the danger zone, all communications were required to be in a code known as the three-number code. This was the only code or cipher permitted. Behind this danger zone, another code known as the three-letter code was allowed to be used. Communications between divisions, corps, and army headquarters were done with the ADFGVX cipher.

The ADFGX and ADFGVX field ciphers were a modified polybius system with single order double columnar transposition and frequent key change, with letters optimized for Morse. It was later broken by the famous French cryptanalyst Georges Painvin. The breaking of the ADFGX cipher by Painvin was the second time during the war that cryptanalysis played a major role in shaping events (the first being the interception and cracking of the Zimmerman Telegram). By breaking the cipher, the French were able to decode an intercepted message about the forwarding of munitions for a German offensive, letting the French know where and when the offensive would occur, and thus allowing them to stop it. This message became known as "The Radiogram of Victory."

== United States ==
Herbert Yardley began as a code clerk in the State Department. After the outbreak of war he became the head of the cryptographic section of Military Intelligence Section (MI-8) and was with the American Expeditionary Force in World War I as a Signals Corps cryptologic officer in France. He later headed the Cipher Bureau, a new cryptanalysis group started in 1919, immediately after World War I, and funded jointly by the State Department and the US Army.

Some American cryptography in World War I was done at the Riverbank Laboratories, Chicago, which was privately owned by Colonel George Fabyan. Elizebeth Friedman, William F. Friedman and Agnes Meyer Driscoll worked there.

The US Navy used the cryptographic code A-1. The US Navy cryptanalysis group, OP-20-G, was also started after World War I (in 1922).

The US also started employing Indian code talkers in World War I, initially with members of the Cherokee and Choctaw tribes.

== See also ==
- World War I
- Cryptography
- History of cryptography
- World War II cryptography
- Japanese cryptology from the 1500s to Meiji
