= Tactical communications =

Orders and reports within a battlefield

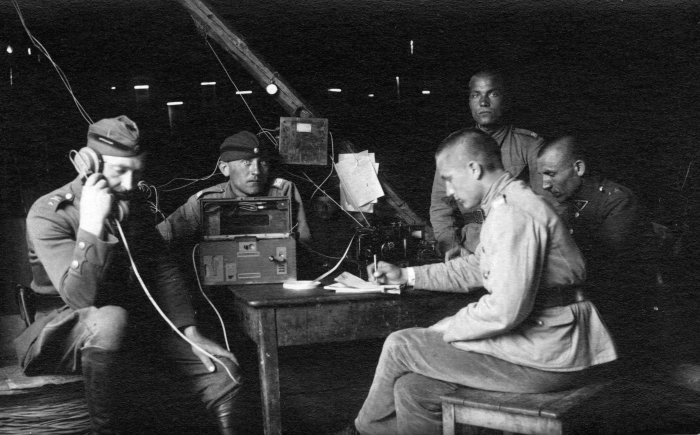
Lithuanian signal corps soldiers, 1930

Tactical communications are military communications in which information of any kind, especially orders and military intelligence, are conveyed from one command, person, or place to another upon a battlefield, particularly during the conduct of combat. It includes any kind of delivery of information, whether verbal, written, visual or auditory, and can be sent in a variety of ways. In modern times, this is usually done by electronic means. Tactical communications do not include communications provided to tactical forces by the Defense Communications System to non-tactical military commands, to tactical forces by civil organizations, nor does it include strategic communication.

== Early means ==
Historical reenactment of Roman legionary with cornu

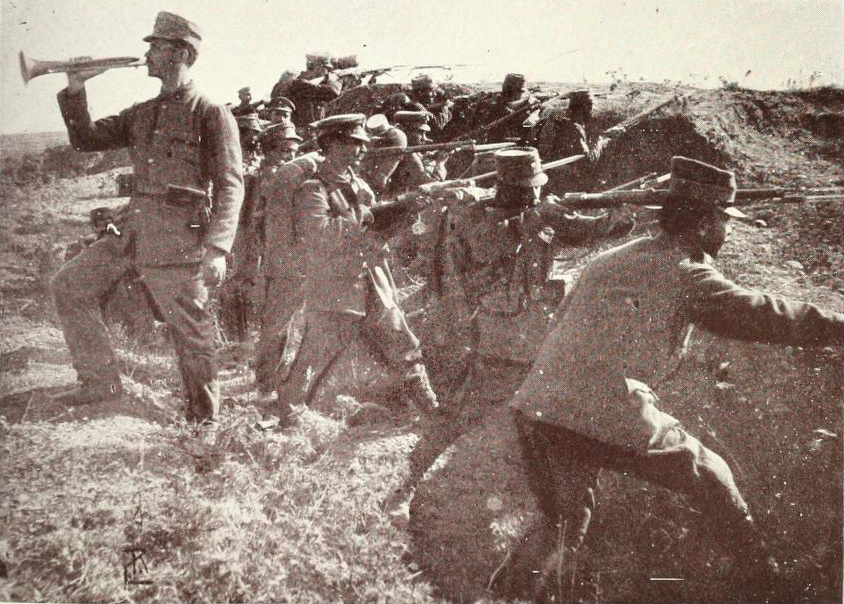
Bugler in Greek Army trench during the Balkan Wars

The earliest way of communicating with others in a battle was by the commander's voice or by human messenger. A runner would carry reports or orders from one officer to another. Once the horse was domesticated messages could travel much faster. A very fast way to send information was to use either drums, trumpets or flags. Each sound or banner would have a pre-determined significance for the soldier who would respond accordingly. Auditory signals were only as effective, though, as the receiver's ability to hear them. The din of battle or long distances could make using noise less effective. They were also limited in the amount of information they could convey; the information must be simple, such as attack or retreat.

Visual cues, such as flags or smoke signals required the receiver to have a clear line of sight to the signal, and know when and where to look for them. Intricate warning systems have though always been used such as scouting towers with fires to signal incoming threats - this could occur at the tactical as well as the strategic level. The armies of the 19th century used two flags in combinations that replicated the alphabet. This allowed commanders the ability to send any order they wanted as they needed to, but still relied on line-of-sight. During the Siege of Paris (1870–71) the defending French effectively used carrier pigeons to relay information between tactical units.

== The wireless revolution ==
Although visual communication flew at the speed of light, it relied on a direct line of sight between the sender and the receiver. Telegraphs helped theater commanders to move large armies about, but one certainly could not count on using immobile telegraph lines on a changing battlefield.

At the end of the 19th century the disparate units across any field were instantaneously joined to their commanders by the invention and mass production of the radio. At first the radio could only broadcast tones, so messages were sent via Morse code. The first field radios used by the United States Army saw action in the Spanish–American War (1898) and the Philippine Insurrection (1899–1902). At the same time as radios were deployed the field telephone was developed and made commercially viable. This caused a new signal occupation specialty to be developed: lineman.

During the Interwar period the German army invented Blitzkrieg in which air, armor, and infantry forces acted swiftly and precisely, with constant radio communication. They triumphed until their enemies equipped themselves to communicate and coordinate similarly.

== The digital battlefield ==
Security was a problem. If you broadcast your plans over radio waves, anyone with a similar radio listening to the same frequency could hear your plans. Trench codes became the tactical part of World War I cryptography. Advances in electronics, particularly after World War II, allowed for electronic scrambling of voice radio. Operational and strategic messages during the war were by text were encrypted with ciphers too complex for humans to crack without the assistance of a similar, high-tech machine, such as the German Enigma machine. Once computer science advanced, tactical voice radio could be encrypted, and large amounts of data could be sent over the airwaves in quick bursts of signals with more complex encryption.

Communication between armies were of course much more difficult before the electronic age and could only be achieved with messengers on horseback or by foot and with time delays according to the distance the messenger needed to travel. Advances in long-range communications aided the commander on the battlefield, for then they could receive news of any outside force or factor that could impact the conduct of a battle.

== See also ==
- Air Defense Control Center
- Combat Information Center
- History of communication
- Network Simulator for simulation of Tactical Communication Systems
- Joint Tactical Information Distribution System
- Mission Control Center
- Naval Tactical Data System
- Electronics technician

== Sources ==
- This article incorporates public domain material from Federal Standard 1037C. General Services Administration. Archived from the original on 2022-01-22. (in support of MIL-STD-188).
- "History of Communications". Bakersfield, CA: William Penn School. 2011. Archived from the original on 14 March 2008.
- Raines, Rebecca R. (19 June 1996). Getting the Message Through: A Branch History of the U.S. Army Signal Corps. Army Historical Series (1st ed.). United States Army Center of Military History. ISBN 978-0160453519. LCCN 95002393. OCLC 32093827. OL 34420751M. Archived from the original on 25 August 2022 – via Federal Depository Library Program.
- Rienzi, Thomas Matthew. "Vietnam Studies: Communications-Electronics 1962–1970. (Washington: Department of the Army, 1985.
- "Signal Corps History". Augusta, GA: United States Army Signal Center. 2012. Archived from the original on 3 April 2013.
