= Listening station =

Facility to monitor radio and microwave signals to gather information and intelligence

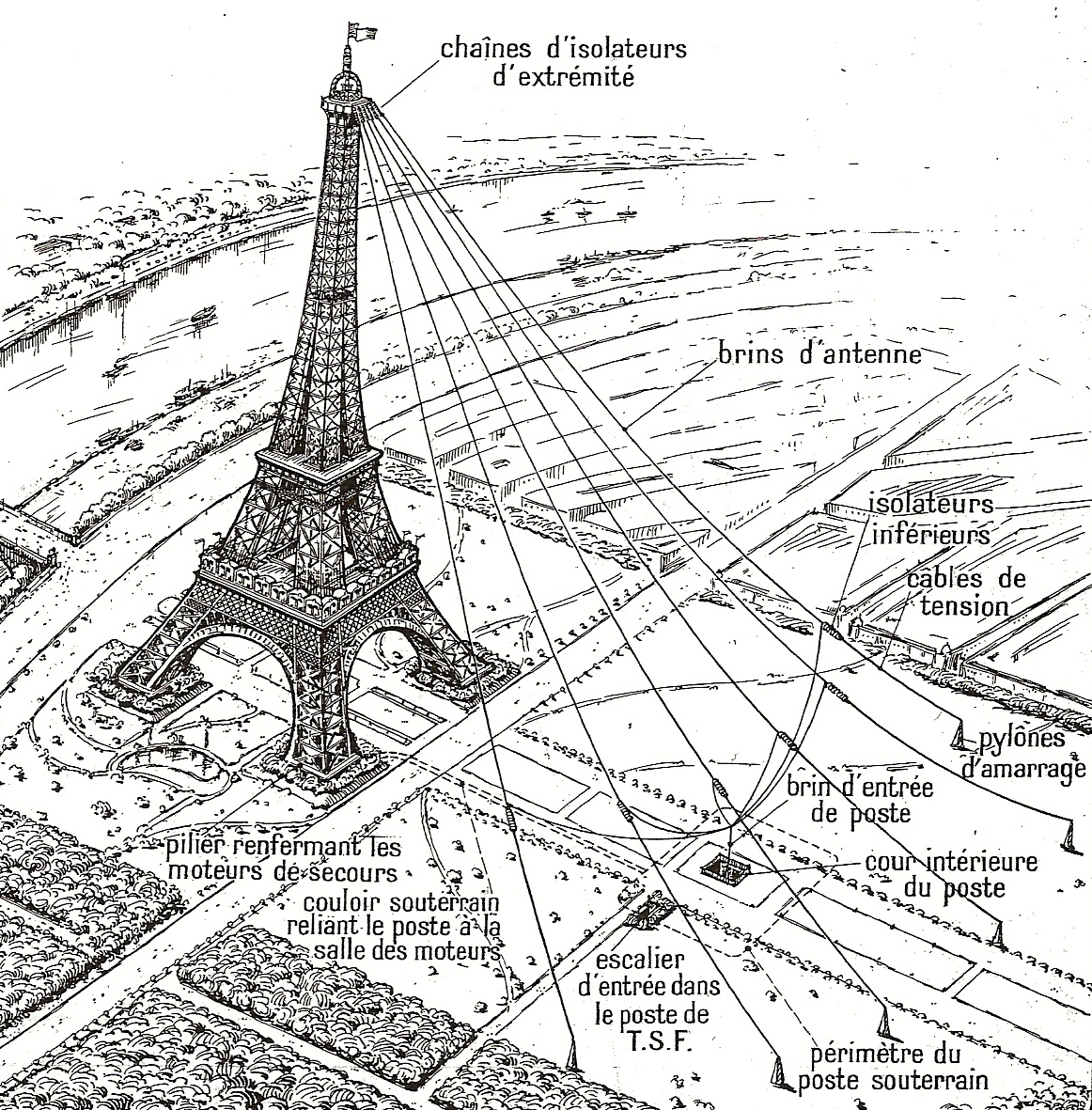
Use of the Eiffel Tower as a listening station to intercept wireless telegraphy (French: télégraphie sans fil T.S.F.) 1914

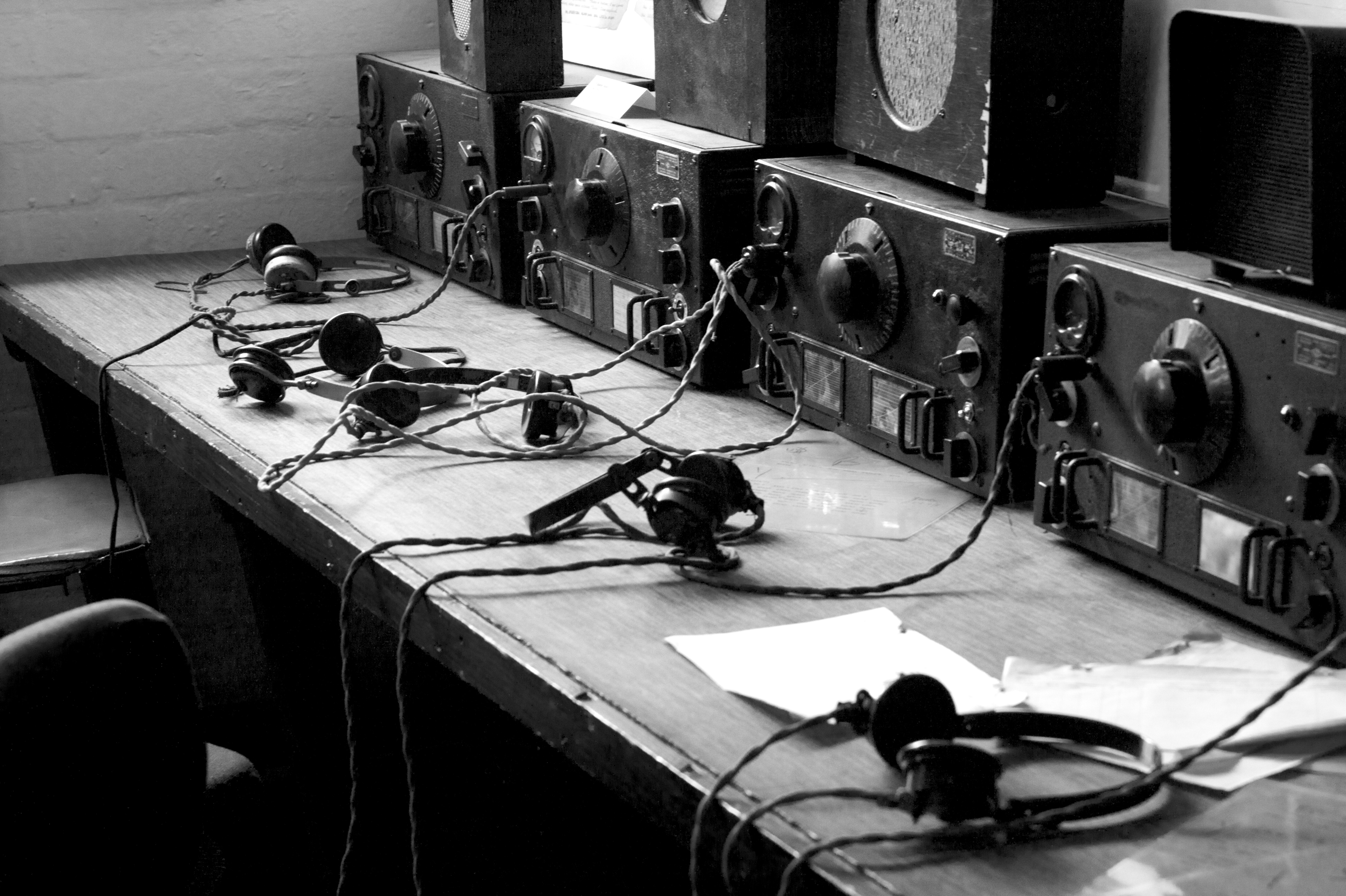
British radio listening station from the Second World War, equipped with the National HRO shortwave radio receivers

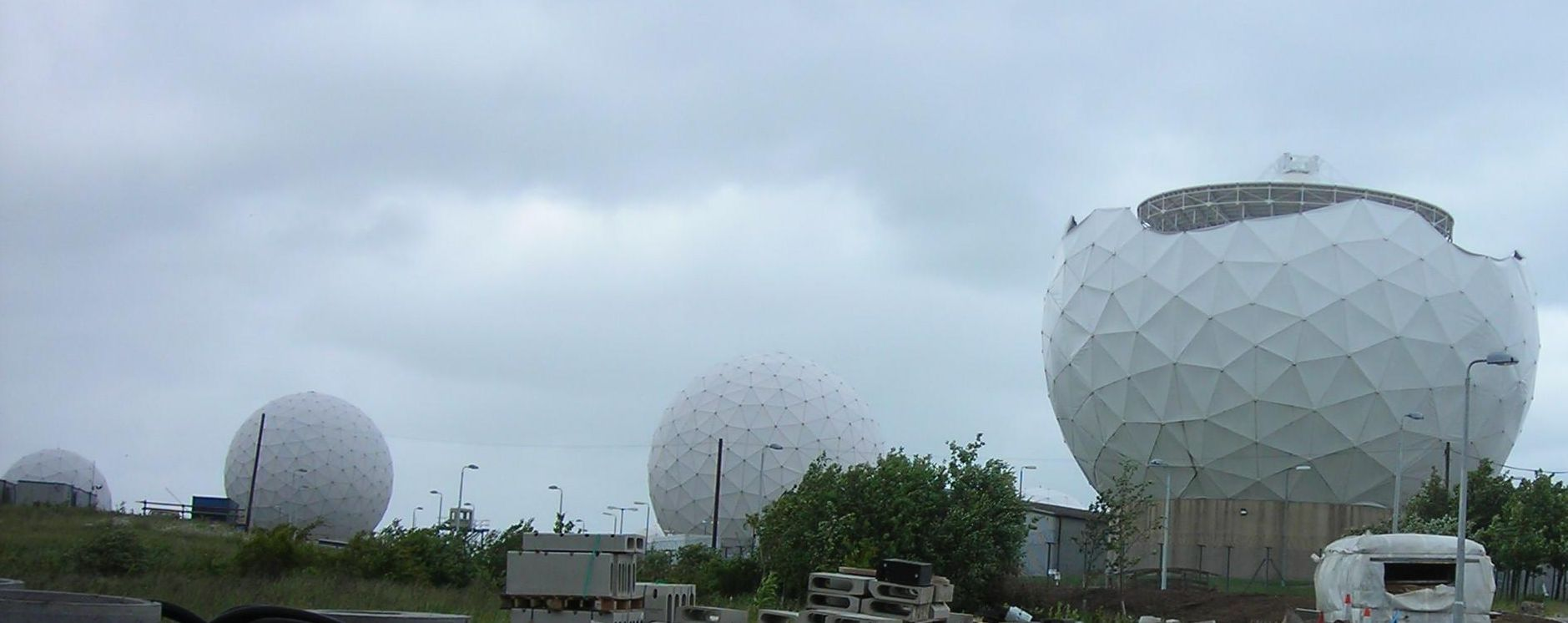
The radomes of listening station RAF Menwith Hill, England, often referred to as "golf balls", protect the parabolic antennas from the weather. On the right radome, which was not yet completely finished in June 2008, part of the parabolic dish can still be seen.

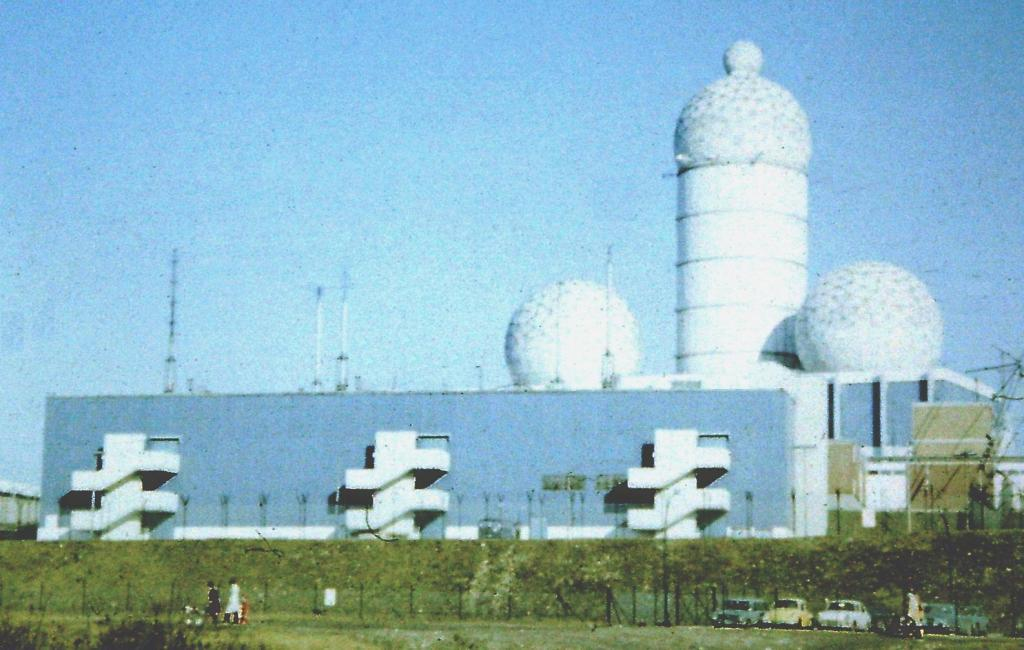
Partial view of the US listening station site at Teufelsberg, Berlin, Germany; Field Station Berlin, 1974

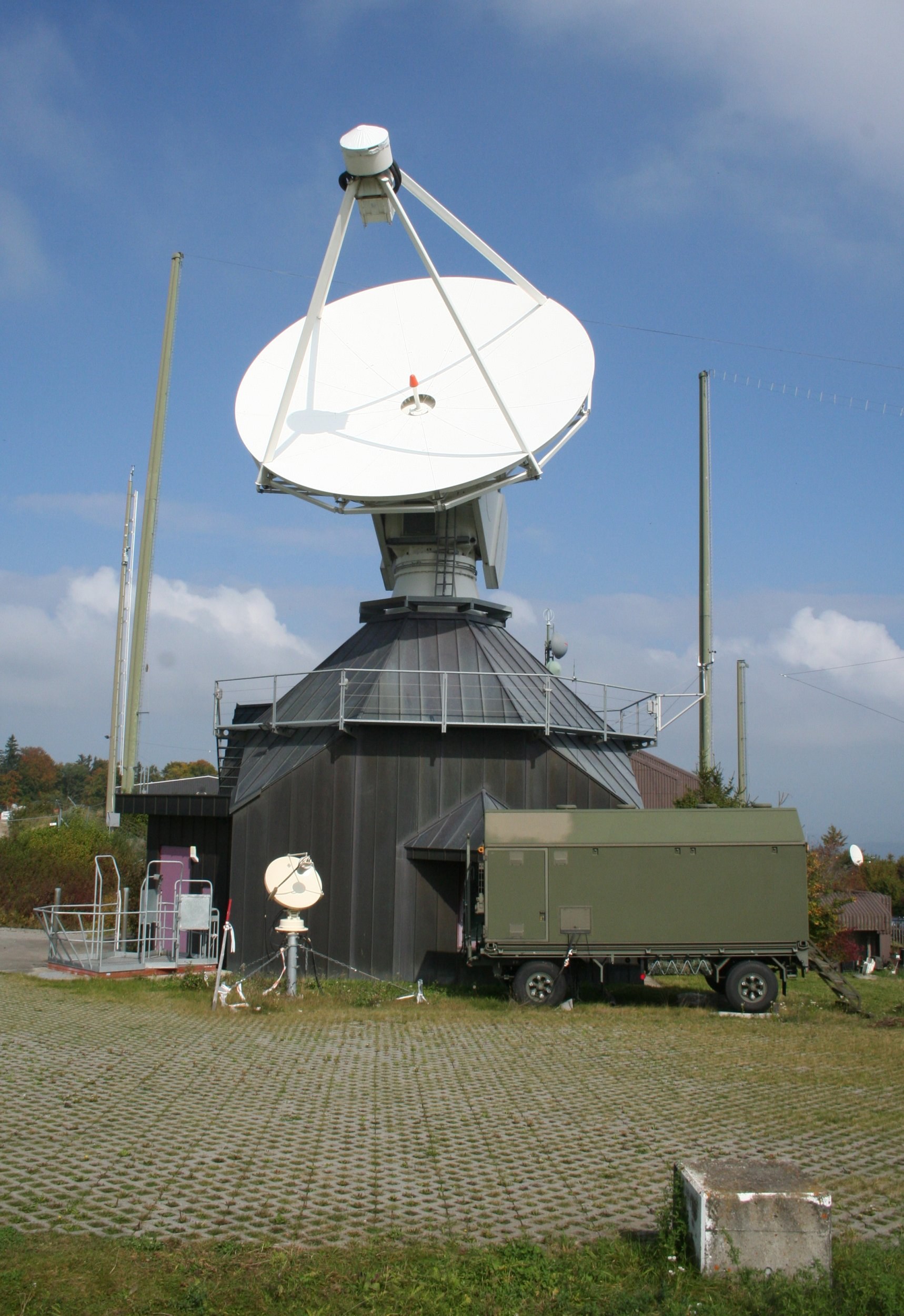
Receiving station of the Onyx interception system in Zimmerwald (Canton of Bern), Switzerland

A radio listening station (also: listening post, radio intercept station or wireless intercept station, W/T station for wireless telegraphy) is a facility used for military reconnaissance, especially telecommunications reconnaissance (also known as signals intelligence SIGINT) by "intercepting" radio transmitter communications. In contrast to the original eavesdropping on an acoustic speech conversation, radio eavesdropping stations are used to eavesdrop on the information transmitted wirelessly using radio technology. For this purpose, highly sensitive radio receivers and suitable receiving antennas are used (see images).

== First World War ==
After Heinrich Hertz (1857–1894) succeeded in 1886 as the first to generate electromagnetic waves in the ultra-short wave range, and Guglielmo Marconi (1874–1937) around 1900 was able to increase the range of his radio transmissions to hundreds of kilometers, thus radiotelegraphy technology was used in the First World War (1914–1918), for example: within the German Imperial Army, the Imperial Russian Army (with fatal consequences in the Battle of Tannenberg due to intercepted Russian radiogram traffic by Germany and Austria), and in aeronautical radio communication. Conversely, France was already using the Eiffel Tower, which was closed to the public during the first year of the War, as a radio listening station to intercept wireless telegraphy (see image). There, in addition to other French listening stations, encrypted wireless telegraphy messages from the German western front were intercepted, the message content of which would later be deciphered, notably by Frenchman Georges Painvin. This includes the so-called Radiogram of Victory (Radiogramme de la Victoire); the ADFGVX-telegram cipher used by the German Imperial Army.

== Second World War ==
In the interwar period between the end of World War I and the beginning of World War II, radio technology had developed considerably and was now used extensively by all warring parties. Detection and evaluation of radio transmissions had become all the more important and were operated by all sides. The encrypted German communications (Enigma, Lorenz, etc.), which were intercepted by British radio listening stations around the world, were of vital importance to the war effort.

Dozens of so-called Government Communications Wireless Stations (GCWS), or Y-stations for short which had initially been established during World War I, and the Admiralty Civilian Shore Wireless Service (ACSWS), were used by the British for this purpose, in Great Britain and elsewhere. German Intercept Station Operations during World War II were comparable, albeit less effective, in the form of the General der Nachrichtenaufklärung (General Intelligence Service) of the German Army and the B-Dienst (observation service) of the Kriegsmarine (German Navy).

== Cold War ==
With the approach of the Cold War, modern radio listening stations established themselves on both sides of the Iron Curtain, especially in the divided Allied-occupied Germany. Up until 1989, for example, there were two powerful monitoring systems on the summit of the Brocken, which lies directly on the former inner German border. One belonged to the Soviet military secret service GRU and was thus also the westernmost outpost of the Soviet Union, the other was subordinate to the main Department III (radio reconnaissance, radio defense) of the Ministry for State Security (Stasi) of the German Democratic Republic (GDR). The stations had the code names "Yenisei" and "Urian", the latter colloquially known as the "Stasi mosque" (Stasi-Moschee). After 1989, a much larger listening complex was planned on the Brocken summit, which was no longer implemented due to the fall of the Berlin Wall and the peaceful revolution in the German Democratic Republic.

During the Cold War period, the United States Army Security Agency built an airspace surveillance and listening station on the man-made hill called Teufelsberg, located in the former West Berlin region of West Germany, to listen to Soviet, East German and other Warsaw Pact nations' military radio communications traffic. The listening station named Field Station Berlin (also known as USM 620 Kilo) was mainly operated by the US National Security Agency (NSA) and served as part of the worldwide surveillance network ECHELON. The installation was also shared with the British Army 26th Signal Battalion and 13th Signal Regiment since it was located in the British occupation zone. During the German reunification process in 1989 and 1990, the facility's electronic equipment was removed and the amassed classified information archives destroyed as it had become redundant with the end of the Cold War. In 1991 the US and British withdrew from Teufelsberg, and the Senate of Berlin sold the 4.7-hectare (12-acre) area of the listening station for 5.2 million Deutsch Mark to a private investor consortium.

A so-called "listening station" in the corner building on Mittelstrasse/Neustädtische Kirchstrasse in Berlin centre (Mitte-district), was believed to have been used between 1977 and 1989 by the East German Ministry for State Security (Stasi) to listen to the American embassy on the opposite side of the street.

== Post-Cold War ==
The superpowers and their allies in particular still operate a wide-ranging network of eavesdropping listening stations around the world. One of the most famous is ECHELON, which is operated by the intelligence agencies of the United States, United Kingdom, Canada, Australia, and New Zealand. Another is the Swiss Onyx interception system, and Frenchelon used by France.

Stationary radio listening stations in Germany are, for example, the Federal Intelligence Service (BND) outposts located in Bad Aibling and Gablingen; both are former US listening stations built during the Cold War in Allied-occupied Germany and are now operated by the German Federal Intelligence Service (BND). In England, RAF Menwith Hill should be mentioned, including BBC Monitoring at Crowsley Park and Government Communications Headquarters (GCHQ) in Cheltenham.

There are also mobile radio listening stations, such as specially adapted radio intercept road vehicles and mobile field tent stations, reconnaissance ships or special reconnaissance aircraft for telecommunication reconnaissance.

== Literature ==
- Wilhelm Flicke: The Beginnings of Radio Intercept in World War I. www.nsa.gov (PDF)
- Michael E. Bigelow: A Short History of Army Intelligence fas.org (PDF)
- David Kahn: The Naval Intercept Station at Bainbridge Island, Washington. Cryptologia, 38:244–247, 2014,
- Kenneth Macksey: The Searchers – Radio Intercept in Two World Wars. Cassell Military Paperbacks, London 2004, ISBN 978-0304366514

== See also ==
- List of established military terms
- Signals intelligence
- Ground station
- ECHELON
- Frenchelon
- Pine Gap
- Chopmist Hill Listening Post
- UKUSA listening stations
