= MI-1 =

MI-1 or MI1 may refer to:

- Michigan's 1st congressional district
- M-1 (Michigan highway)
- Mission: Impossible, 1996 film
- MI1, a department of the British Directorate of Military Intelligence
- Mil Mi-1, a Soviet three- or four-seat light utility helicopter
