= Malcolm Vivian Hay =

British Army officer & cryptographer (1881-1962)

Major Malcolm Vivian Hay of Seaton
- Malcolm Vivian Hay in 1914
- Born: 21 January 1881; London, England
- Died: 27 December 1962 (aged 81); Aberdeen, Scotland
- Education: St Basil's grammar school, St John's preparatory school
- Occupation(s): Cryptographer and historian
- Spouse(s): Florence de Thiene, Alice Ivy Hay
- Children: James Malcolm Hay, Elizabeth Hay, Georgiana Hay, and Peter Brian Hay
- Parent(s): James Gordon Hay and Elizabeth Forbes

Major Malcolm Vivian Hay of Seaton (1881–1962) was an officer in the Gordon Highlanders, a cryptographer during the First World War, a historian of Catholic and Jewish history, and the last Laird of Seaton House in Aberdeen, Scotland. The grounds of the estate are now Seaton Park.

== Early life ==
Malcolm Hay was born in London to James Gordon Hay and Mary Catherine Cox, and was the grandson of Lieutenant-General James Hay (1786–1862) and Elizabeth Forbes. He had an elder brother, Gilbert, who died in infancy, and a younger brother, Cuthbert. At the age of two, James Gordon Hay died, and Malcolm inherited the estate. He was educated first at St Basil's grammar school at Frognall Hill, and then at St John's, a Jesuit preparatory school near Windsor. Hay's mother died in 1892, and he was subsequently raised by his aunt Georgina Hay, a former abbess at Sedan before the Franco-Prussian war, in France against the wishes of his father's will.

As a young man, Hay did not attend a university, but was self-educated, studying Italian. He lived in Paris, but he returned to Scotland in 1907, joining the 3rd Battalion of the Gordon Highlanders as an officer and managing his estates. In 1911, he travelled to Ireland to gather information on the Republican movement for Parliament. He also engaged in politics, defending the Catholic Church's interests in Quebec. Unlike other members of his class, Hay was a liberal and a Scottish nationalist.

== First World War ==
Hay was transferred from the Militia to the 1st Battalion of the Gordon Highlanders, and saw action early in the First World War in Belgium. At the Battle of Mons, he was severely wounded in the head and taken prisoner by the Germans and imprisoned at Wurzburg. His wound caused his right side to be paralysed, and he had to re-learn how to walk. In 1915, Evelyn, Princess Blücher, whose brother knew Hay, arranged for his release and he became the first British officer to be released and returned to the United Kingdom in the war. In 1916, he published Wounded and a Prisoner of War based on his experiences.

After recovering from his wound, Hay joined the War Office as head of the MI1(b), the cryptography department in 1915. Although the department was small at the time, consisting of only three members, Hay greatly expanded it to include many professors and other intellectuals across the United Kingdom as well as the United States of America. He also developed new codes for the British Army that remained in use until the beginning of the Second World War.

== Career as a historian ==
On the conclusion of the First World War, Hay returned to Aberdeen; however, he also spent much of his time in London researching in the archives of the British Museum. He befriended Bishop George Bennett, Bishop of Aberdeen, who allowed him access to the historical archives of Blairs College. Hay published the archive as The Blairs Papers in 1929.

In 1927, Hay published A Chain of Error in Scottish History, which alleged that much of Scottish historiography at the time reflected severe anti-Catholic prejudices. In particular, he focused many of his arguments on the historiography of Celtic Christianity, and accused historians of distorting historical data to fit the notion of an independent Celtic Church which was the forerunner of the Presbyterian Church. The book proved controversial for its iconoclasm, and journals such as the Times Literary Supplement and the Scottish Historical Review condemned it in equally controversial reviews. In July 1928, the Scottish Historical Review was forced to publish an apology for its review of the Chain of Error after receiving numerous complaints from historians who believed the editors to have misjudged Hay. Clifford Williamson (2016) notes that much of its negative reception came from the anti-Catholicism which Hay criticised, and that Catholic intellectuals such as Hilaire Belloc considered it to be an important work of scholarship. In 1931, Hay had an audience with Pope Pius XI for his contributions to Catholic historiography, where he presented the Pope with a copy of the Chain of Error.

In 1934, Hay published The Jesuits and the Popish Plot, which centred around the Popish Plot, a nonexistent but widely believed Catholic conspiracy to assassinate Charles II of England and to install his brother, the future James II and VII to the throne. The scandal resulted in the execution of 35 people, including the five Jesuit priests indicated in the title. The book was widely read and received many positive reviews in contrast to the Chain of Error.

In the Second World War, Hay supported relief efforts for Scottish prisoners of War in Nazi Germany, and met Alice Ivy Paterson, who was also engaged in charity. Paterson introduced him to Jewish refugees fleeing Nazi persecution, such as Chaim Weizmann, and it was from these humanitarian activities that he became a committed philosemite and Zionist. In 1950, Hay published The Foot of Pride (later retitled Europe and the Jews) about the history of anti-Semitism in Europe. In the book, he condemned the Pope for his silence on the genocide of the Jews.

== Personal life ==
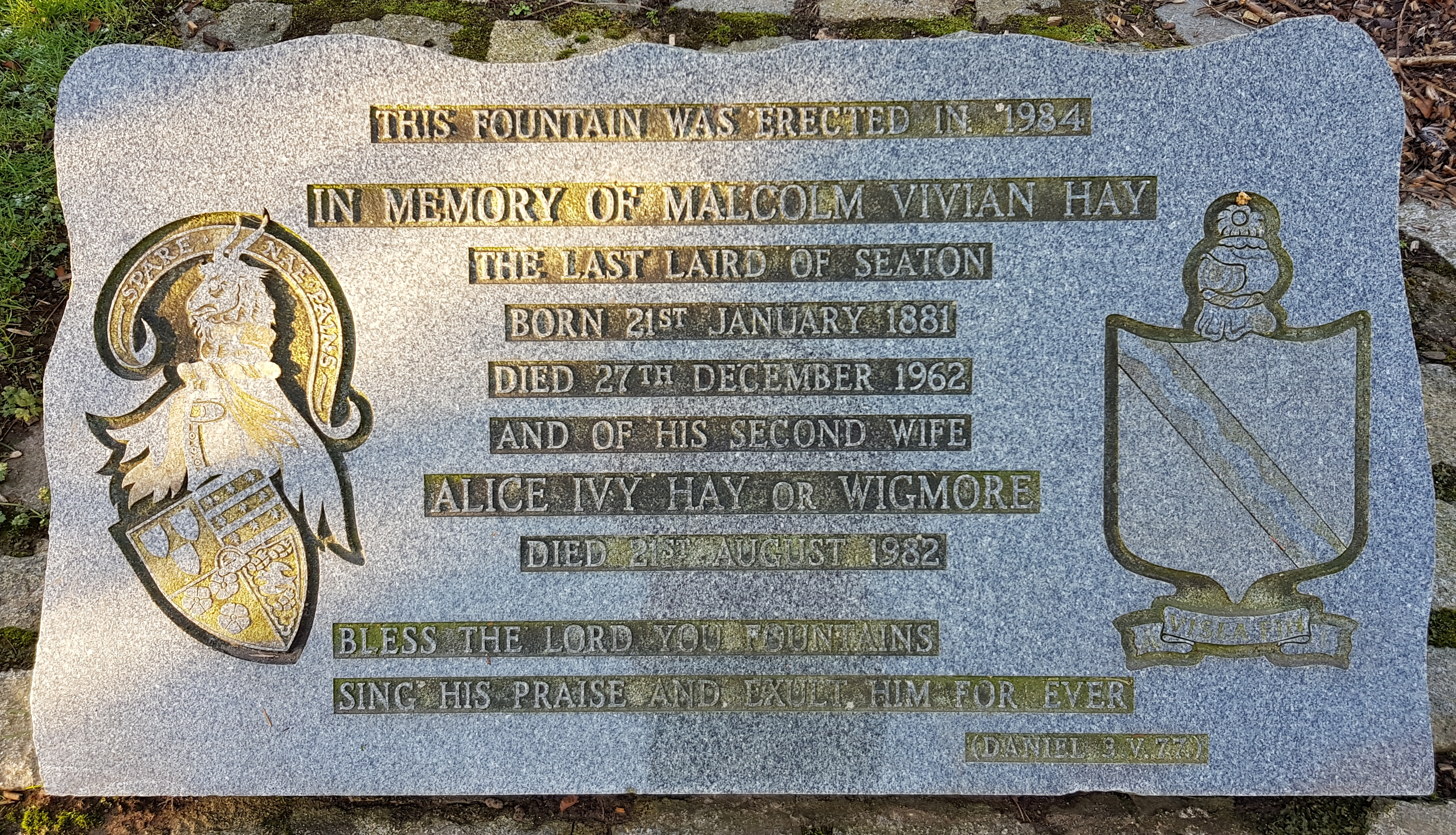
Plaque marking a fountain commemorating Malcolm and Alice Hay in Seaton Park.

In 1903, Hay married his first cousin Florence de Thiene (d. 1943), and had four children. He married his second wife, writer, philanthropist and public speaker Alice Ivy Hay (née Wigmore) in 1956. After his death, she published his biography, Valiant for Truth, in 1971.

In 1947, he sold the grounds of Seaton House to the City of Aberdeen, which became Seaton Park. The abandoned house was severely damaged by fire and was demolished in 1963.

In September 1962, Hay underwent an operation for a prostate gland condition. Although the operation was successful, he died on December 27 from complications from the surgery.

== See also ==
- World War I cryptography
