= Chopmist Hill Listening Post =

FCC listening post in Scituate, RI

Coordinates: 41°49′11″N 71°38′43″W

The location of the listening post at Chopmist Hill in Scituate, Rhode Island

The Chopmist Hill Listening Post was one of the radio listening stations that were established by the Federal Communications Commission. The stations, located within the United States, listened to radio traffic during World War II. It was located in Scituate, Rhode Island. It was also known as the Scituate Monitoring Station. It was the largest, and most effective, of 13 similar installations that were part of the nationwide network. Others were at Fort Ward, Washington, Winter Harbor, Maine, Amagansett, New York, Cheltenham, Maryland, and Jupiter, Florida.

== History ==
The FCC established the Radio Intelligence Division (RID) on July 1, 1940. It was created to monitor and investigate clandestine wireless operations within United States territory. It also trained military personnel and intelligence agents in radio monitoring techniques.

About one year before the United States entered WW2 Thomas B. Cave was sent to Rhode Island to set up a radio listening post. In March 1941 he abandoned his first choice of Greenville, RI for a farmhouse with 183 acres (74 ha) of land located on Darby Road (Note: The latitude / longitude coordinates used in this article are based on the building photos at the Varnum Blog.) near Chopmist Hill in Scituate, Rhode Island. The hill is 732 feet (223 m) above sea level, making it one of the highest points in the state. (Note: The highest point is Jerimoth Hill at 812 feet (247 m)) The FCC leased the farmhouse from Mr. William A. Suddard. The FCC assigned 40 RID radio operators to the Chopmist Hill post. The facility tracked enemy troop movements, Allied bombing missions, and intercepted radio transmissions from German spies. It also assisted in locating downed Allied aircraft.

The completed listening post contained over 80,000 feet (24,000 m) of wire, 11 antennas and many advanced radio receivers. The complex had a power-generating station and was surrounded by a 6 feet (1.8 m) high barbed wire fence. The site included two direction finding antennas. These could be rotated to get a bearing on the transmitting station. This information when compared with similar measurements from other distant stations allowed the transmitting location to be triangulated. The use of two of these antennas meant both parties in a conversation could be located.

After the war it continued operating by monitoring amateur radio bands, detecting distress calls, and locating interference (including pirate radio stations) affecting commercial broadcast stations. The staff was reduced to 6. The listening post was closed Jan. 30, 1951 and moved to Millis, Massachusetts. More recently, Chopmist Hill has been used by amateur radio operators for the ARRL Field Day event.

== Reception ==
The resulting listening site had characteristics way above what had been hoped for. A variety of signals were picked up with a regularity that cannot be explained. In Mr. Cave's words "This site was the best location in the country for radio transmission and reception".

This site, as well as others, was a well-guarded secret until the FCC authorized a reporter to visit the site in November 1945.

The station had no difficulty picking up radio transmissions between tanks in North Africa that were part of German Field Marshal Erwin Rommel's Afrika Corps.

== Countries heard ==
=== Caribbean ===
The quick response of this station allowed it to home in on German submarines in the Caribbean prompting the supervisor to state that "we were practically in on the kill" when describing the destruction of German Submarines.

=== Africa ===
From West Africa a large variety of clandestine radio transmitters was detected. In the African desert not only were the German command center-to-tank transmissions received but also tank-to-tank transmissions were clearly audible. The reception of these signals helped to turn the tide in the North Africa campaign.

=== South America ===
From South America spies transmitting back to Germany were detected and most countries cooperated in efforts to shut down the transmissions. The one exception to this was Argentina with its Pro Nazi Sympathies.

One report sent to German submarines contained the scheduled departure date of the Queen Mary as well as its intended route to Australia. The destruction of this ship along with its 14,000 soldiers would have been a heavy blow but this was prevented by the eavesdropping ability of Chopmist Hill.

=== Pacific Ocean ===
From the Pacific Ocean signals were picked up of TNT-carrying Japanese balloons that had been released to follow the jet stream to the United States. The positions of these balloons was transmitted to Allied forces who shot them down.

=== East Coast ===
On the East Coast of the United States from Labrador to Florida signals of lost planes were picked up. Their position was triangulated and instructions to the planes were transmitted to enable them to arrive in the United States. This action saved thousands of people including actress Kay Francis who was returning home after a USO tour.

=== Germany ===
Vital local weather reports for the Germany homeland were purposely transmitted on frequencies that did not reach England but these transmissions were detected at Chopmist Hill.

== Disbelief from the Army ==
Approximately 127 tests were made to ensure the site was able to accomplish what it claimed to do. In one test a station was set up in the Pentagon with a wire hanging out a window to transmit a signal. The objective was to see how long it would take various receiving stations to detect this signal. Chopmist Hill detected it in seven minutes.

== Site for the UN ==
When the war ended Chopmist Hill's remarkable reception and transmission abilities led to its being considered as a site for the soon-to-be constructed United Nations Complex. This plan was abandoned when John Rockefeller donated funds to purchase a 16 acres (6.5 ha) site on the East River in New York City.

== See also ==
- Listening station
- Signals intelligence
- Direction finding
- Adcock antenna
- Y service
