= Seaton Park =

Park in Aberdeen, Scotland

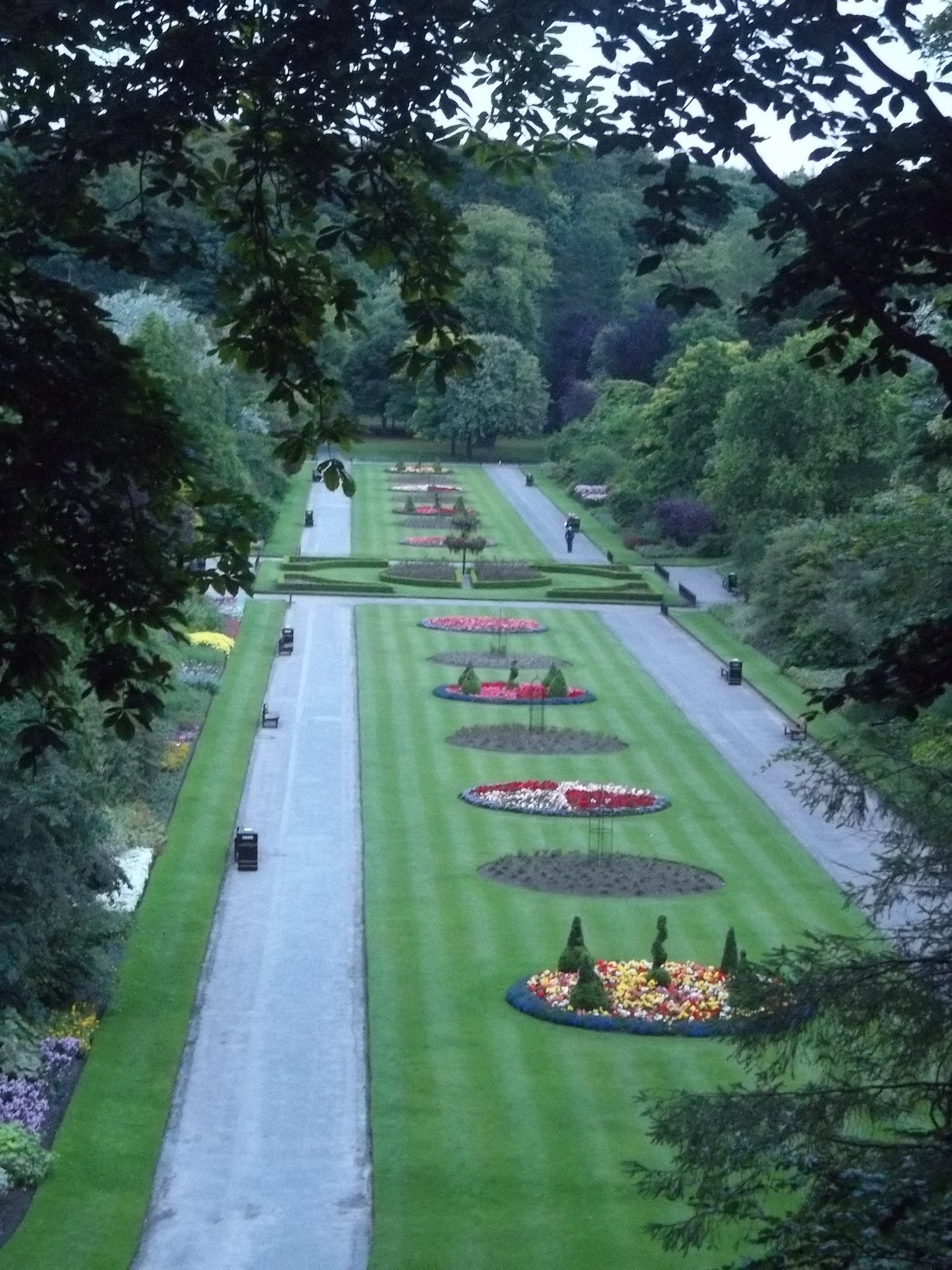
- Interactive map of Seaton Park
- Type: Public Park
- Location: Old Aberdeen, Aberdeen, Scotland
- Coordinates: 57°10′18″N 2°6′9″W
- Area: 27 hectares (67 acres)
- Created: (bought by the city) 1947
- Operator: Aberdeen City Council
- Status: Open all year

Seaton Park is a public park in the Old Aberdeen area of Aberdeen, Scotland. One of the city's biggest parks, it was bought by the city for use as a public park in 1947 from Major Malcolm Vivian Hay, a cryptographer during the First World War and a historian of Catholic and Jewish history. It was formerly the grounds of Seaton House, which had been the Hay family home for centuries, but was gradually wound down as a family house due to inheritance tax, the contents were sold off in 1959 and the already dilapidated house burnt down in 1963.

The River Don passes through the edge of the park, and there are paths running along both sides of the river. There are well-maintained flower beds on the lawns that run down the centre of one of the park's main pathways, with flowers that are tended daily and planted annually. There is also a secluded set of walled gardens next to a small private housing mews called Seaton Stables. The park is low-lying and has a tendency to flood. In 2016, part of the park was turned into a wetland area to help manage the flooding while creating new wildlife habitats.

The park is often used as a path for students of the University of Aberdeen to move between the university campus and the Hillhead Halls of Residence, which lie atop a hill overlooking the park on the side opposite from St. Machar's Cathedral. The path from the residence halls to the campus leads along the flowerbeds on the main walkway and past the Cathedral via the Chanonry Road. The University authorities advise students to be cautious during dark hours due to the lack of street lighting.

== Historic features ==
The park is home to Mr Therm, a locomotive manufactured by Andrew Barclay in 1947 that previously operated at the Aberdeen Gas Works. The locomotive has formed part of the children's playpark since 1974. During 2017, it was refurbished and repainted.

Wallace Tower, situated at the southern edge of the park, is a 17-century building that was formerly located in the city centre but was dismantled and moved to Seaton Park in the 1960s to make room for an expansion of Marks & Spencer.

== Gallery ==
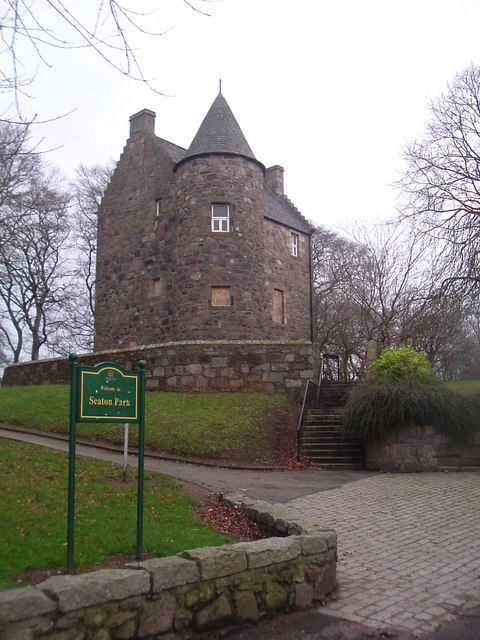
Wallace Tower

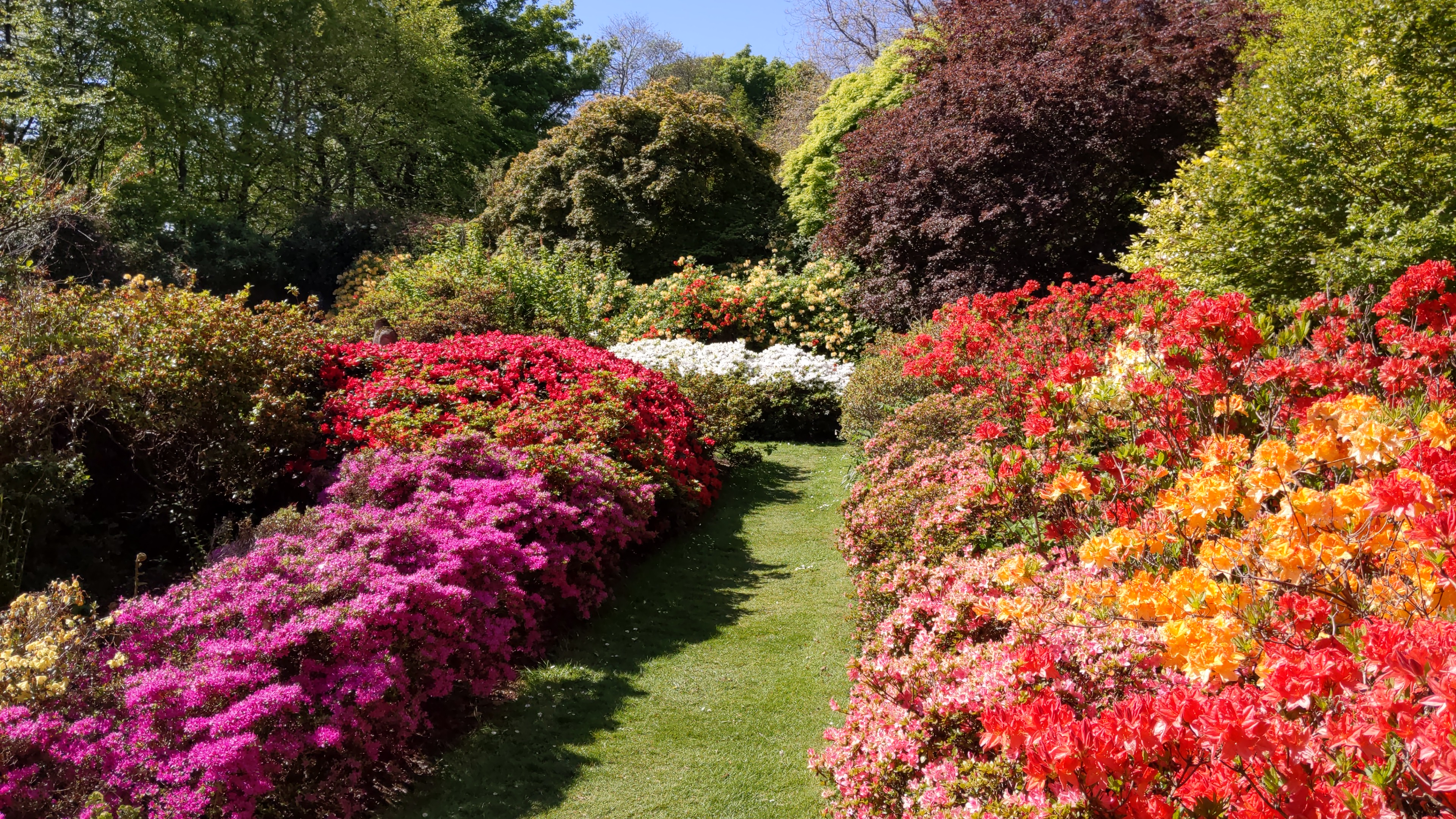
The walled garden

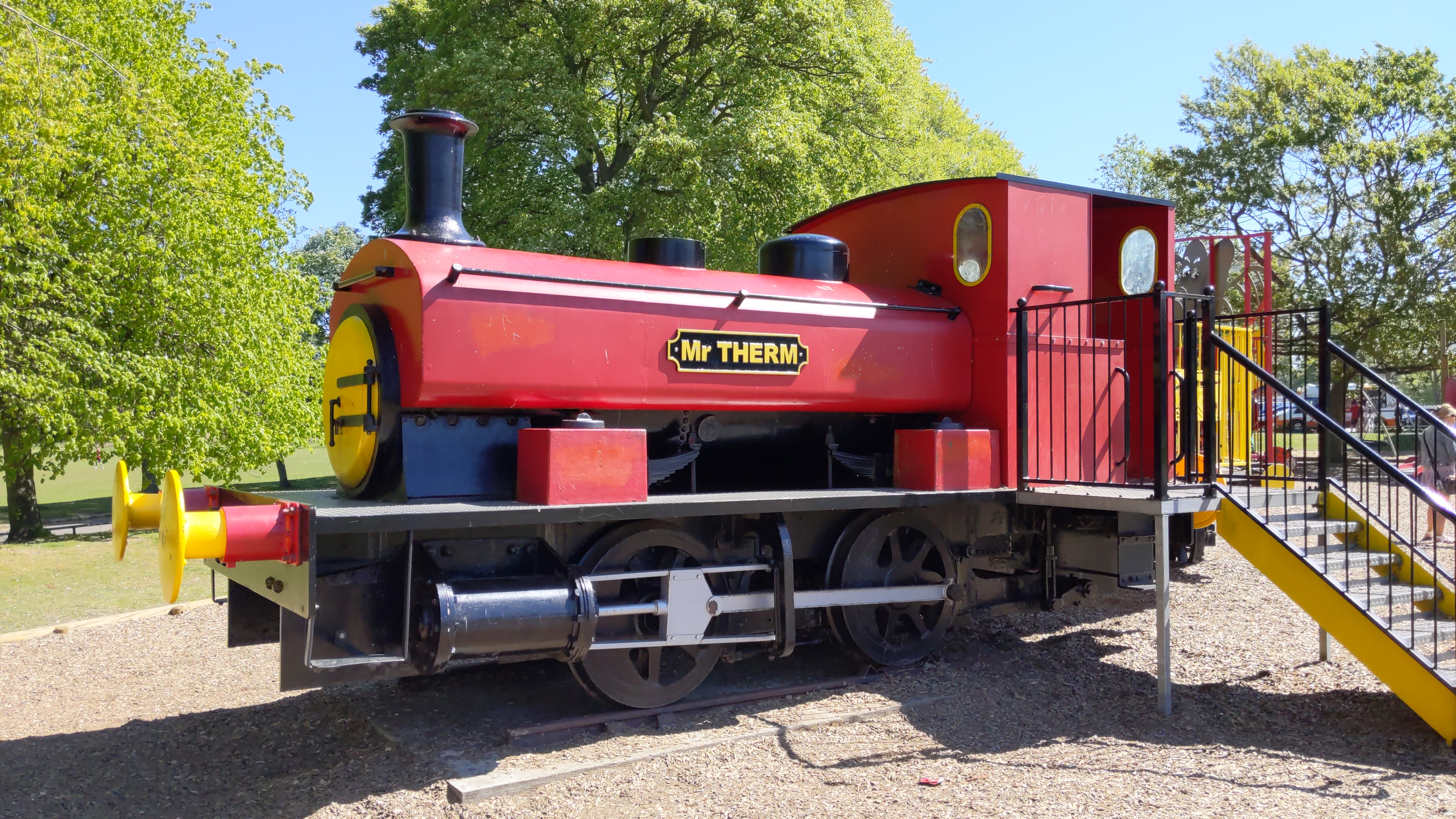
Mr Therm
