= Alice Ivy Wigmore =

(1895–1982) violinist and philanthropist

- Born: 9 January 1895; Mildura
- Died: 21 August 1982 (aged 87); Aberdeen
- Spouse(s): Walter Edward Moncrieff Paterson; Malcolm Vivian Hay
- Children: Lorna Paterson

Alice Ivy Wigmore became Alice Ivy Hay and Alice Ivy Paterson (9 January 1895 – 21 August 1982) was an Australian violinist, writer and philanthropist. She abandoned years of training to marry. She later took to writing, including a book addressed to her grandson. She made major bequests to educational institutions including the Royal College of Music and the Wigmore Music Library at the University of Western Australia.

== Life ==
Wigmore was born in 1895 in Mildura, Victoria, Australia. Her parents were Alice Elizabeth (born Wallis) and Herbert John Wigmore. Her father was a businessperson and her mother was skilled pianist. When she was twelve years old she went to study at the Royal College of Music in London accompanied by her mother who had been her first teacher. She was one of only three students invited to London for two years and her stay was extended for another two years and then again. She learned piano, violin and at her request, voice. She passed her final exams but the outbreak of war prevented her from staging her musical debut. Her journey back was made via India and Ceylon where she met Walter Edward Moncrieff Paterson of Tilliefoure.

She decided to abandon her music ambitions and marry Paterson. They had a daughter Lorna. Lorna later married Orde Wingate. Wingate rose to a Major General who created the unconventional fighting force known as "The Chindits". Orde Wingate was an outstanding soldier who died young in 1944 and six weeks before the birth of his son and her grandson, Orde Jonathan Wingate.

Her second husband was Major Malcolm Vivian Hay of Seaton, a military officer and cryptographer in the First World War and a historian of Catholics in Britain. They married in 1956 and he died in 1962. The year before she had written her first book, Under the Eiderdown: The diary of a dachshund. Wigmore used the name "Alice Ivy Hay" to write a biography of Orde Wingate, her son-in-law titled "There was a Man of Genius : Letters to my Grandson Orde Jonathan Wingate" which was published in 1963. Her grandson, Lt Col Orde Jonathan Wingate became a regimental colonel.

== Legacy and death ==
After she became a widow for the second time she gave substantial gifts to educational institutions. The Royal College of Music received money to fund performers from the Ivy Wigmore-Hay award.

Wigmore gave thousands of pounds to the University of Western Australia after meeting Sir Frank Callaway. She gave him money that enabled him to purchase music for a music library and to fund the building of the Wigmore Music Library in memory of her mother. That music library "The Wigmore" is said to be the finest in Australia. In Aberdeen she gave money that enable the Malcolm Hay Memorial Lecture to be made each year and to fund work to counter anti-semitism. Wigmore died in 1982 in Aberdeen, Scotland and she was buried in St Machar's Cathedral, Scotland where the Hay family have a vault.

The purpose-built library at the University of Western Australia she had funded was "repurposed" as a studio which inherited the Wigmore name.
