= Abhorchdienst =

The Abhorchdienst (i.e. "Listening Bureau") was a German code-breaking bureau which operated during the final years of the First World War. It was established in 1916 and was composed mainly of mathematicians. Other countries, such as France and Austria-Hungary, had set up similar organisations at an earlier stage. Still, the military context did not necessitate the development of the German bureau until 1916.
