= Georges Painvin =

French cryptographer (1886–1980)

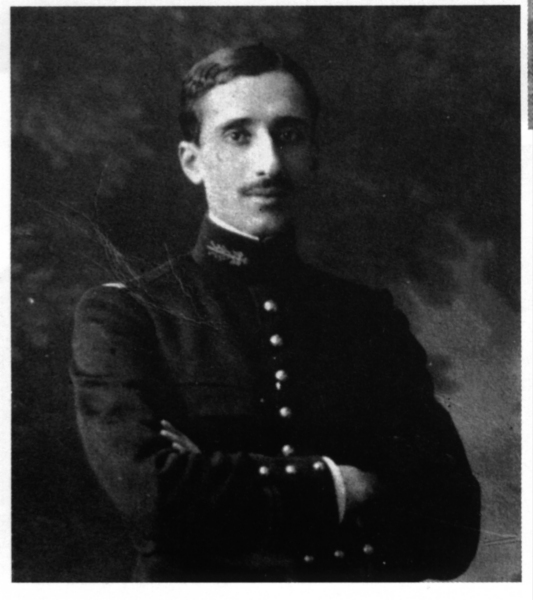
- Painvin in French military uniform, 1914
- Born: Georges Jean Painvin; 28 January 1886; Paris, France
- Died: 21 January 1980 (aged 93); Paris, France
- Education: École polytechnique École des mines de Paris
- Occupations: Geologist, professor, army officer, cryptanalyst, industrialist
- Known for: Code breaking during the First World War, especially the German ADFGX/ADFGVX cipher
- Spouse: Marianne Lefort
- Military career
- Allegiance: France
- Service years: 1914–1918
- Rank: Captain
- Unit: Artillery
- Conflicts: First World War
- Awards: Grand Officer of the Legion of Honour

Paris Chamber of Commerce
- President
- In office January 1944 – October 1944

Georges Jean Painvin (French: [ʒɔʁʒ(ə) pɛ̃vɛ̃]; 28 January 1886 – 21 January 1980) was a French geologist, professor, army captain, cryptanalyst, and industrialist, best known for breaking the German ADFGX and ADFGVX cipher systems during the First World War.

== Early life ==
Painvin was born into a family of École polytechnique graduates and mathematicians from Nantes. In addition to his distinguished scientific education, he was also a keen cellist, receiving First Prize for cello at the Nantes Conservatory of Music in 1902.

In 1905, Painvin passed his matriculation exam into the École polytechnique. In his second year, he opted for admission to the Corps des mines, where he would pursue his professional career. However, French military service briefly interrupted this path: on 7 September 1907, he was appointed reserve second lieutenant and assigned to the 33rd Artillery Regiment to complete his three years of obligatory service. In 1909 and again in 1911, he undertook only short periods of military duty lasting a few days. It was not until 1908 that Painvin entered the École Nationale Supérieure des Mines for a three-year study, where he ranked fourth out of six students in his class. Upon completion, he graduated as an engineer.

In 1911, Painvin was appointed professor of palaeontology at the Ecole des Mines de Saint-Étienne, and from 1913 held a similar post at the École des mines de Paris. On 1 September 1911, he was promoted to lieutenant in the reserve and reassigned to the 53rd Artillery Regiment the following year. In October 1913, he completed a probationary period at the École supérieure de guerre (French Army War College), leading to his assignment to the staff service on 6 April 1914.

Painvin's teaching career was soon interrupted by the outbreak of the First World War. Upon mobilisation, he was recalled to active service in the French Army.

== Initial cryptanalysis ==
Painvin was assigned to the staff of General Maunoury's Sixth Army, where he served as an orderly officer. Under Maunoury's command, he took part in the Battle of Ourcq. His position afforded him a degree of autonomy, which enabled him to pursue an interest in cryptology and cipher systems. Upon befriending Captain Paulier of the French Army — who introduced him to telegram and communication protocols — Painvin began contributing to the French war effort through cryptanalysis. Though he had no formal training in the field, he demonstrated considerable enthusiasm and aptitude for deciphering encrypted messages.

Painvin requested access to intercepted cryptograms transmitted by the invading Imperial German Forces. It was not long before he distinguished himself in the field of cryptanalysis. He was assigned to the Cabinet noir — the French black room — which he would occupy until the end of the war. The encrypted telegrams comprised both military and diplomatic communications, some transmitted as far afield as between Berlin and Constantinople. Within this role, Painvin focused on the cipher systems of the Imperial German Navy, followed by those of the Austro-Hungarian Navy, which had previously remained entirely indecipherable. He succeeded in breaking these codes, thereby enabling a more effective campaign against German submarines (U-boats). On 21 January 1915, Painvin proposed a method known as the ARC system, which allowed the cryptographic key to be identified from a single encrypted text.

The German forces employed several cipher systems, but this did not deter Painvin — quite the opposite. Working alongside Colonel Olivari, he undertook the cryptanalysis of the triliteral ABC cipher. After two weeks of intensive effort, the pair succeeded in reconstructing the encrypted messages, despite deliberate attempts by the Germans to mislead them with false transmissions. One particular stream of encrypted diplomatic communications contributed to the unmasking of the spy Mata Hari; during the early months of the war, Painvin's work enabled French intelligence to closely track the activities of this enemy figure.

In 1917, the Germans introduced the KRU field cipher — a more complex system that employed a distinct cryptographic key for each army unit. Despite its intricacy, it became the subject of meticulous analysis by Painvin and Captain Guitard.

== The "Radiogram of Victory" ==
During the spring of 1918, Paris was subjected to sustained bombardment by German Gotha G.IV bomber aircraft and heavy artillery. The French were initially unable to break the newly introduced ADFGX cipher — designated by the German Imperial Army as Geheimschrift der Funker 1918 (GedeFu 18), translated as "Secret Cipher of the Radio Operators 1918" — which had been in use since 1 March 1918. As a result, they were unable to anticipate German attacks. On 5 April 1918, shortly after the launch of the Spring Offensive, French cryptanalyst Painvin succeeded in identifying two cryptographic keys used in the ADFGX system and began deciphering intercepted messages. His breakthrough enabled the decryption of transmissions dated from 1 April onwards.

In June 1918, the German Imperial Army was preparing for a final push on the Western Front aiming to cover the 100 kilometres (62 miles) that separated it from Paris. The Allies urgently needed to determine the location of the impending German offensive. At this critical stage of the war, the German cipher system had grown more complex: on 30 May, the letter "V" was added to the earlier ADFGX cipher, creating the enhanced ADFGVX variant.

On 1 June 1918, the French listening station atop the Eiffel Tower intercepted a German radio transmission for the first time that included not only the letters A, D, F, G and X, but also the newly introduced letter V. The message originated from German army outposts in the region of Remaugies, north of Compiègne, and read as follows:

FGAXA XAXFF FAFVA AVDFA GAXFX FAFAG DXGGX AGXFD XGAGX GAXGX AGXVF VXXAG XDDAX GGAAF DGGAF FXGGX XDFAX GXAXV AGXGG DFAGG GXVAX VFXGV FFGGA XDGAX FDVGG A

Painvin recognised this and correctly concluded that the Germans had expanded the Polybius square from 5×5 to 6×6, enabling the encoding of 36 characters rather than the previous 25 letters. He also correctly surmised that the 26 letters of the alphabet, along with the 10 digits (0 to 9), were employed, and based his cryptanalysis on that assumption. After some 26 hours of intensive work — to the point of physical exhaustion — he succeeded in reconstructing both the grid and the permutation used for the encryption, and was able to decipher the intercepted message on 2 June 1918. The authentic plaintext message read in German:

"Munitionierung beschleunigen Punkt Soweit nicht eingesehen auch bei Tag"

Translated into English: "Accelerate munitions provisioning. Full stop. If not observed, also during the day."

The message decoded and relayed to Marshal Ferdinand Foch's headquarters near Compiègne, was interpreted as evidence of a planned German offensive in that sector. In response, Foch ordered the concentration of his last reserve troops around Compiègne, a strategically vital junction northeast of Paris. This redeployment proved decisive: when the German attack materialised shortly thereafter, the reinforced Allied positions successfully repulsed the assault, preserving the integrity of the front.

Breaking the German ADFGVX cipher took a severe toll on Painvin’s physical and mental health. Shortly after the decrypted message was delivered, he collapsed from exhaustion. In the aftermath of the Armistice, worn down by years of intense cryptanalytic effort, Painvin was compelled to enter a prolonged period of convalescence. On the French side, the intercepted German transmission has since become known as Le Radiogramme de la Victoire — the Radiogram of Victory.

For his painstaking efforts and determination, Painvin was honoured with the title of Knight of the Legion of Honour in a military capacity on 10 July 1918. However, he was unable to disclose or discuss his wartime accomplishments for much of his later life, as the activities of numerous French government services remained classified until 1962. In December of that year, his contribution to the war effort in the field of codebreaking was publicly acknowledged by General Desfemmes. On 19 December 1973, Painvin was elevated to the rank of Grand Officer of the Legion of Honour.

The inventor of the ADFGX/ADFGVX cipher, the German signal corps officer Lieutenant Fritz Nebel, did not learn of Painvin's achievement until 1967. In 1966, nearly fifty years after the cipher's wartime use, Nebel discovered that his system had been broken during the First World War. He remarked that he had originally proposed a double-column transposition as the second stage of the encryption method. However, his suggestion was rejected by superiors in favour of a simpler — and cryptographically weaker — single-column transposition. Two years later, in 1968, Nebel and Painvin met in person. Nebel expressed his sentiments by saying that the enemies of yesterday meet as the friends of today. Painvin, in turn, noted that had Nebel's original proposal been adopted, he would not have succeeded in breaking the cipher.

The American cryptologist Herbert Yardley in The American Black Chamber would say of Painvin:

Captain Georges Painvin, the greatest coding expert that France had, a first-rate analytical genius, had a way of solving messages in code which resembled witchcraft ...

== After 1918 ==
After the War, Painvin resumed his teaching activities on a part-time basis during the interwar period. He also served as chairman of several companies and played a key role in the rapid expansion of the Société d’électrochimie, d’électrométallurgie et des aciéries électriques d’Ugine (SECEMAEU), translated as Company for Electrochemistry, Electrometallurgy and Electric Arc Furnace Steel Production in Ugine. He was appointed director general in 1922.

The company mobilised new electrochemical methods to produce the first stainless steels on a large scale and at affordable prices, aided by the French inventor and industrialist René Marie Victor Perrin (1893–1966), who developed the Ugine-Perrin process. Forty years later, the company remained at the forefront of technological advancement with the inauguration of the vast Fos-sur-Mer steelworks near the Rhône.

In addition to his leadership at the steelworks company in Ugine, Painvin chaired Crédit Commercial de France from 1941 to 1944. Beginning in 1934, he also contributed to the reorganisation of the Paris Stock Exchange, which he presided over from 1940. He served as chairman of the chemical industries organising committee, and from January 1944, held the presidency of the Paris Chamber of Commerce. Several studies have examined Painvin's activities during the German military occupation of France (1940–1944). Contemporary accounts described him as "a large-scale industrialist, who works very sincerely and very honestly with the German services"; and noted that "in the minds of many people, Mr Painvin was regarded as pro-regime".

Under two demission proceedings — one before the Court of Justice of the Seine and the other before the Comité national interprofessionnel d'épuration (CNIE; National Interprofessional Purification Committee) — for acts of collaboration by French civilians during the German occupation of France, Painvin resigned as president and administrator of the Ugine steelworks on 12 December 1945. In the aftermath of the Second World War, he chose to withdraw from public life and relinquish most of his professional responsibilities.

In 1948, Painvin relocated to Casablanca, where in 1950 he was entrusted with the presidency of the industrial, financial, and services conglomerate Omnium Nord-Africain. He also served as delegate president of the Société Chérifienne d'Exploitation d'Ouvrages Maritimes and the Société Chérifienne du plâtre, and was a member of the Casablanca Chamber of Commerce and Industry.

Painvin retired in 1962 and returned to France at the age of 76. He died in 1980, aged 93.

== Literature ==
- "The Codebreakers", Kahn, David (1996). The Codebreakers: The Comprehensive History of Secret Communication from Ancient Times to the Internet. New York: Simon and Schuster. ISBN 978-0-684-83130-5.
- Bauer, Craig (2013). Secret History – The Story of Cryptology. Boca Raton: CRC Press. ISBN 978-1-4665-6186-1.
- Friedman, William (1935). FIELD CODES, used by the German Army during the World War, Technical Paper (PDF). Washington: War Department, Office of the Chief Signal Officer.
- The Annals of Mines: Georges Jean PAINVIN (1886-1980) (in French).
- Singh, Simon (2000). The Code Book, The Secret History of Codes and Codebreaking. London: 4th Estate. ISBN 978-1-85702-889-8.
