= Tableau de Concordance =

The Tableau de Concordance was the main French diplomatic code used during World War I; the term also refers to any message sent using the code. It was a superenciphered four-digit code that was changed three times between 1 August 1914 and 15 January 1915.

The Tableau de Concordance is considered superenciphered because there is more than one step required to use it. First, each word in a message is replaced by four digits via a codebook. These four digits are divided into three groups (one digit, two digits, one digit) so that when the whole message has been translated into code, the four-digit sets can be put together so it looks like the entire message is made up of two-digit pairs. This is called a "Straddle Gimmick." Then, in turn, each of these two digit pairs (and the single digits at the beginning and end) are replaced by two letters. The letters are then combined with no spaces for the final ciphertext.

The manual for the Tableau de Concordance included the instruction that if there was not adequate time for completely enciphering the message, it should simply be sent in clear, because a partially enciphered message would have provided insight into the inner workings of the code.

== Sources ==
- The Codebreakers, by David Kahn, copyright 1967, 1996
