= MI1 =

Department of the British Directorate of Military Intelligence

MI1 or British Military Intelligence, Section 1 was a department of the British Directorate of Military Intelligence, part of the War Office. It was set up during World War I. It contained "C&C", which was responsible for codebreaking.

Its subsections in World War I were:

- MI1a: Distribution of reports, intelligence records.
- MI1b: Interception and cryptanalysis.
- MI1c: The Secret Service/SIS.
- MI1d: Communications security.
- MI1e: Wireless telegraphy.
- MI1f: Personnel and finance.
- MI1g: Security, deception and counterintelligence.

From 1915, MI1(b) was headed by Malcolm Vivian Hay. Oliver Strachey was in MI1 during World War I. He transferred to the Government Code and Cypher School and served there during World War II. John Tiltman was seconded to MI1 shortly before it merged with Room 40.

In 1919, MI1b and the Royal Navy's (NID25) "Room 40" were closed down and merged into the inter-service Government Code and Cypher School, which subsequently developed into the Government Communications Headquarters (GCHQ) at Cheltenham.
