= Joseph Finnegan (cryptographer) =

American cryptographer

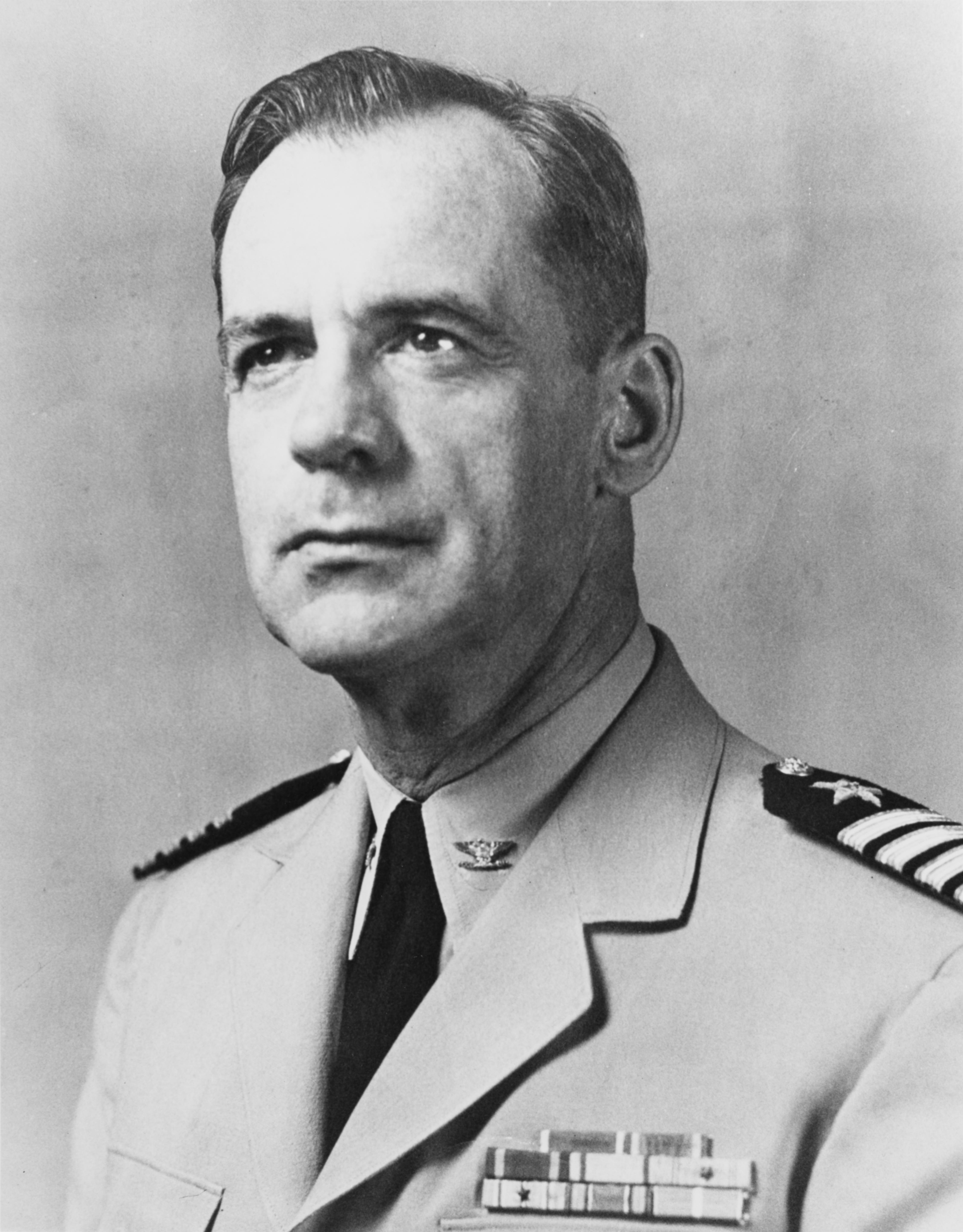
Joseph Finnegan as a Captain in the early 1950s

Joseph Finnegan (August 12, 1905 – September 8, 1980) was a United States Navy linguist and cryptanalyst with Station Hypo during the Second World War.

== Early life and education ==
Joseph Finnegan was born and raised in Dorchester, Massachusetts. His father was Peter Joseph Finnegan and his mother was the former Marion Catherine Connor. Joseph Finnegan had a brother and four sisters. He enlisted in the U.S. Navy in 1922 as an apprentice seaman and later served as a yeoman third class on the battleship USS Mississippi.

Finnegan attended the Naval Academy preparatory school in San Diego, California, and finished first in his class. Appointed to the United States Naval Academy, he graduated fifteenth in a class of 153 in 1928. Finnegan served as an ensign on the battleship USS Florida from August 1928 to November 1930. Promoted to lieutenant (junior grade) in 1931, he helped commission the heavy cruiser USS New Orleans in February 1934 and then served as her radio officer.

Later in 1934, Finnegan was selected by the Office of Naval Intelligence to attend three years of full immersion Japanese language and culture training in Tokyo. While still there, he was promoted to Lieutenant in 1936. After completing his training, Finnegan was assigned to Station CAST in the Philippines in October 1937. He served there until relieved by Captain Alva Lasswell in September 1938.

== War contribution ==
In 2002, Tex Biard described Finnegan as "intuitive" and "brilliant", and second only to Station Hypo chief Joseph J. Rochefort, saying that Finnegan's survival of the bombing of the USS Tennessee was a "fatal mistake" on the part of the Japanese, and that Finnegan's survival "cost (the Japanese) the war." He was reattached to the Division of Naval Communications after the attack and promoted to Lieutenant Commander on January 1, 1942.

Edwin T. Layton, in his book "And I Was There: Pearl Harbor and Midway -- Breaking the Secrets" (1985) recounts a tremendous effort by Finnegan on the Hypo team concerning the exact date on which the attack on Midway would occur. This involved the date-time groups in Japanese naval messages.

Layton refers to the date-time data as being “superenciphered,” meaning that this data was preencoded even before it was added to the JN-25 cipher. When Hypo made their all-out effort to crack this, they started by searching the stacks of printouts and punched cards for five-digit number sequences. Those they found were in low grade codes, a poor starting point, but a starting point.

Next they had to unravel the cipher itself. It was Lieutenant Joseph Finnegan, a linguist-cryptanalyst, who finally hit upon the method that the Japanese had used to lock up their date-time groups.

Layton describes this method as "involving a 12 x 31 (12 rows for months, 31 columns for day) garble check. The 31 kana [Japanese syllabic scripts] of the first row were A, I, U, E, O, KA, KI …………….HA, HI, HU, HE, HO. The second row was I, U, E, O ……………HE, HO, A; the third, U, E, O ……….HO, A, I, and so on, for 12 rows. At the left, representing the 12 months, was a column of 12 kana, different from those in the table – SA, AI, SU, SE, SO, TA, TI, TU, TE, TO, NA, NI (SA for January, NI for December). To encipher, for example 27 May, one picked the 5th line (May=SO), ran across to the twenty-seventh column, HA, and recorded the kana at that intersection, HO. The encipherment, then, was SO, HA, HO, the third kana providing the garble check." (Layton, pp. 427–428)

Finnegan was promoted to Commander on September 15, 1942, and later promoted to Captain on March 25, 1945. He was awarded the Legion of Merit for his World War II contributions.

== Postwar career ==
Finnegan was credited with Korean War service and retired from the Navy in January 1953 for medical reasons. He was buried at Arlington National Cemetery on September 11, 1980.
