= Alva B. Lasswell =

United States Marine Corps linguist and cryptanalyst

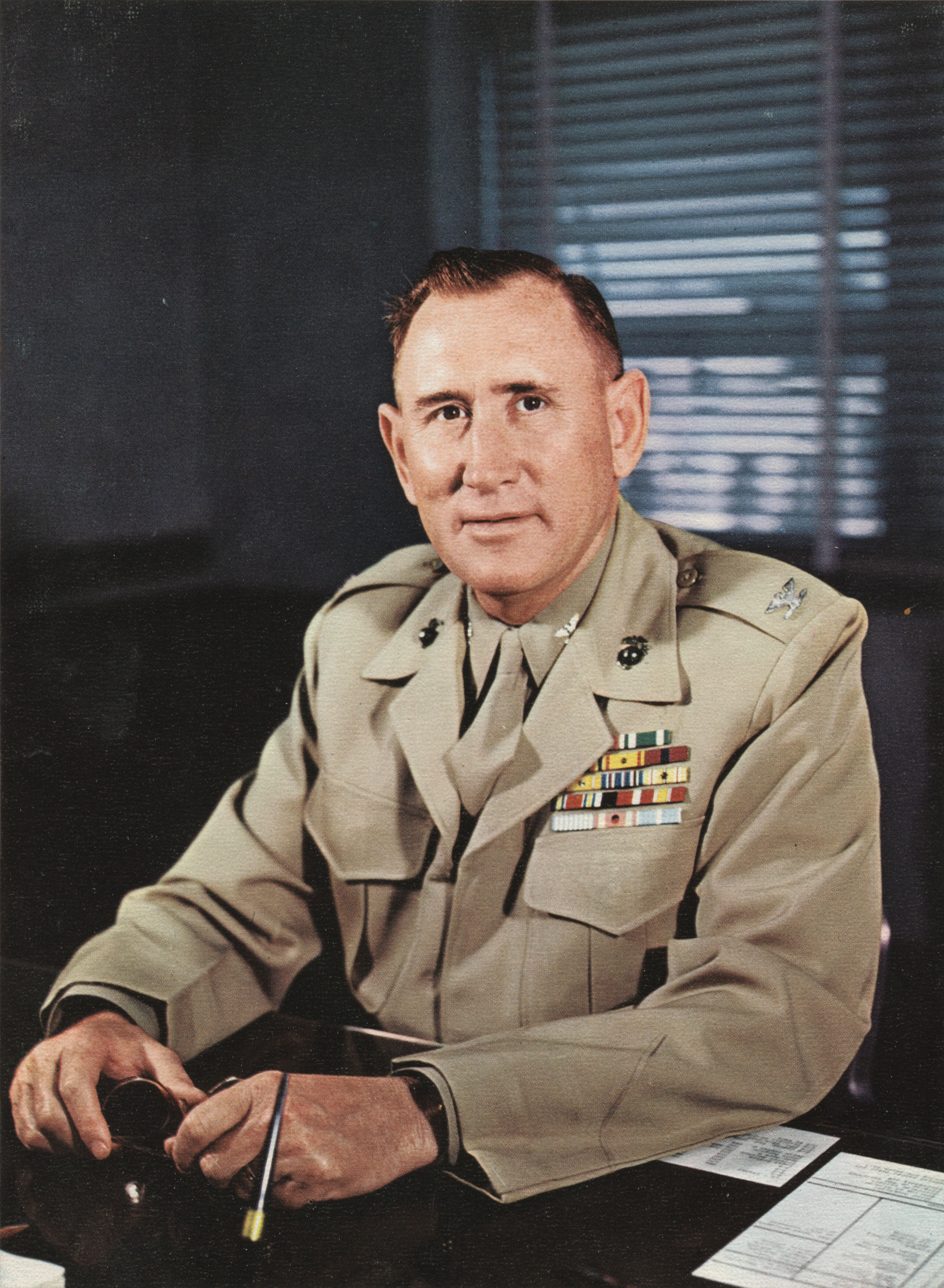
- Born: January 3, 1905; McLeansboro, Illinois, U.S.
- Died: October 28, 1988 (aged 83); Vista, California, U.S.
- Military career
- Allegiance: USA
- Branch: United States Marine Corps
- Service years: 1925–1956
- Rank: Colonel
- Nickname: Red
- Commands: 1st Marine Division (Acting); 7th Marine Regiment
- Awards: Legion of Merit

Alva Bryan "Red" Lasswell (January 3, 1905 – October 28, 1988) was a United States Marine Corps linguist and cryptanalyst during World War II. In 1942, he contributed to the identification of Midway Atoll as the Japanese military target codenamed AF. In April 1943, Lasswell helped decrypt the coded itinerary of Admiral Isoroku Yamamoto, leading to his interception by Army Air Forces fighter planes near Rabaul.

== Early life and education ==
Lasswell was born in McLeansboro, Illinois, but raised in Piggott, Arkansas. He attended Piggott High School and Rector High School, but never graduated. He was homeschooled by his father Charles, a teacher, and showed an aptitude for mathematics. In 1921, Lasswell moved to Oklahoma and found work as an accountant.

== Military career ==
Lasswell enlisted in the U.S. Marine Corps in 1925. Selected for officer candidate school, he was commissioned as a second lieutenant on June 8, 1929. From 1932 to 1933, he served with the Marine detachment on USS Arizona. Promoted to first lieutenant in 1934, Lasswell joined the 5th Marine Regiment in Quantico, Virginia, later that year. Assigned to teach FBI agents small arms marksmanship, he received a letter of commendation from Director J. Edgar Hoover.

In 1935, Lasswell was sent to Tokyo for three years of full immersion Japanese language and culture training. While there, he was promoted to captain in 1936. In September 1938, Lasswell was sent to Station CAST in the Philippines to relieve Lieutenant Joseph Finnegan and receive cryptology training. This was followed by a military intelligence posting to Shanghai.

Lasswell was reassigned to Station HYPO at Pearl Harbor in 1941. He was promoted to major on April 29, 1942.

After the Battle of the Coral Sea in May 1942, the team of intelligence officers at Station HYPO were hard at work trying to determine what the Japanese Navy would do next. Led by Joseph Rochefort, the team, which included Lasswell and Joseph Finnegan, established that a Japanese force of four aircraft carriers planned to strike Midway Island on June 4, 1942. As a result, Admiral Chester Nimitz was able to prepare an ambush using his three remaining aircraft carriers. Lasswell was promoted to lieutenant colonel on August 7, 1942.

On April 14, 1943, a coded Japanese message was intercepted by American radio operators. After 18 hours of effort by the team at Station HYPO, it turned out to be the itinerary for a visit by Admiral Isoroku Yamamoto to the Japanese front lines near Rabaul and the northern Solomon Islands. Lasswell and his supervisor Jasper Holmes delivered the translated message to the Pacific Fleet intelligence officer Edwin Layton, who in turn passed it on to Admiral Nimitz. Yamamoto was killed in an attack by planes from the U.S. Army Air Forces 339th Fighter Squadron on April 18, 1943. Lasswell was promoted to colonel on November 5, 1943.

After the end of the war, Lasswell was awarded the Legion of Merit for his naval intelligence and Marine Corps Intelligence contributions.

In 1947, Lasswell briefly served as acting commander of the 1st Marine Division. He later commanded the 7th Marine Regiment from October 1, 1947, to May 10, 1948. He retired from active duty in May 1956.

== Personal ==
Lasswell was married to Elizabeth Louise "Betty" Pearce for 50 years (1938 – 1988). They were married on June 3, 1938, in Tokyo, where Betty's father was an expatriate American engineer working on electrification projects. Betty had been the top-seeded female tennis player in Japan while studying at the American School. The couple had three wedding ceremonies in one day: a church service, a Japanese civil ceremony at the Akasaka Ward Office and an American civil ceremony officiated by U.S. Ambassador Joseph Grew. Their honeymoon trip to Formosa doubled as an opportunity to map the location of Japanese military installations. The couple later had two sons and, as of 2006, three grandchildren and four great-grandchildren.

== Legacy ==
Lasswell Hall at Fort George G. Meade in Maryland, the headquarters of Marine Corps Forces Cyberspace Command, was named in his honor. On November 4, 2019, Lasswell was inducted into the Cryptologic Hall of Honor at National Security Agency headquarters.
