= Attack on Pearl Harbor in popular culture =

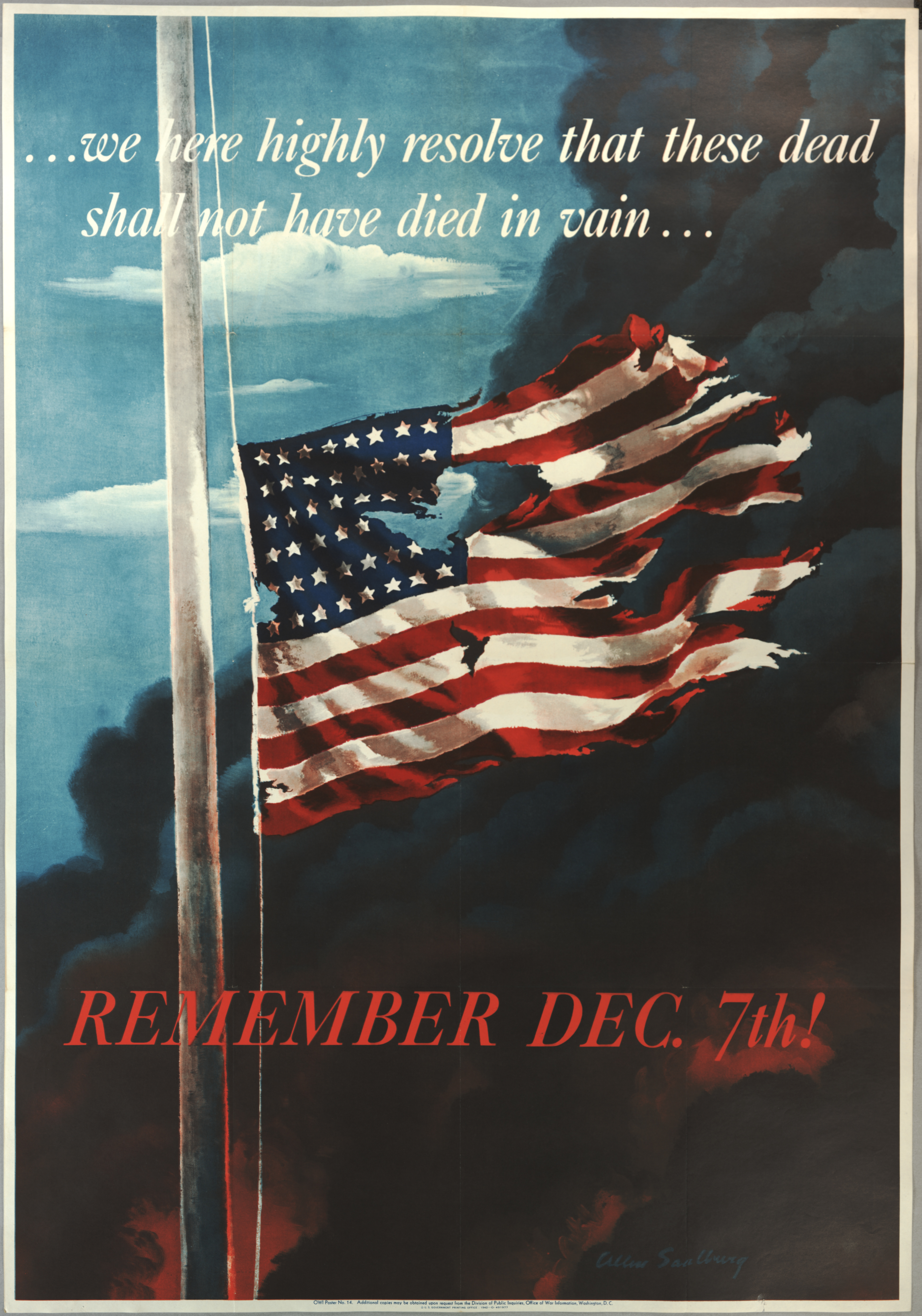
Remember December 7th!

The attack on Pearl Harbor has received substantial attention in popular culture in multiple media and cultural formats including film, architecture, memorial statues, non-fiction writing, historical writing, and historical fiction. Today, the USS Arizona Memorial on the island of Oahu honors the dead. Visitors to the memorial reach it via boats from the naval base at Pearl Harbor. The memorial was designed by Alfred Preis, and has a sagging center but strong and vigorous ends, expressing "initial defeat and ultimate victory". It commemorates all lives lost on December 7, 1941.

Although December 7 is known as National Pearl Harbor Remembrance Day, it is not a federal holiday in the United States. The nation does however pay homage remembering the thousands injured and killed when attacked by the Japanese in 1941 and on Pearl Harbor Day the American flag should be flown at half-staff until sunset. Schools and other establishments in many places around the country do observe lowering the American flag to half-staff out of respect. Ceremonies are held annually at Pearl Harbor itself, attended each year by some of the ever-dwindling number of elderly veterans who were there on the morning of the attack.

The naval vessel where the war ended on September 2, 1945—the last U.S. Navy battleship ever built, USS Missouri—is now a museum ship moored in Pearl Harbor, with its bow barely 1,000 feet (300 meters) southwest of the Arizona memorial. The last surviving vessels from the attack are also museum ships, the US Coast Guard cutter USCGC Taney, which is located in the Inner Harbor of Baltimore, Maryland, and the US Navy tug Hoga at the Arkansas Inland Maritime Museum.

== In fiction ==
- James Jones. From Here to Eternity. New York: Charles Scribner's Sons, 1951.
- Neal Stephenson. Cryptonomicon. New York : Avon Press, 1999.
- Gore Vidal. The Golden Age. New York : Doubleday, 2000.
- Jeff Shaara. To Wake the Giant. New York: Ballantine Books, 2020.

== In drama ==
- Mark Siegelberg. The face of Pearl Harbour. Melbourne: The View, [1944]. New edition along with the German language original text Das zweite Gesicht / The Face of Pearl Harbor. Ed. and with an introduction by Tomas Sommadossi. Munich, Iudicium 2017.

== In films, television, and video games ==
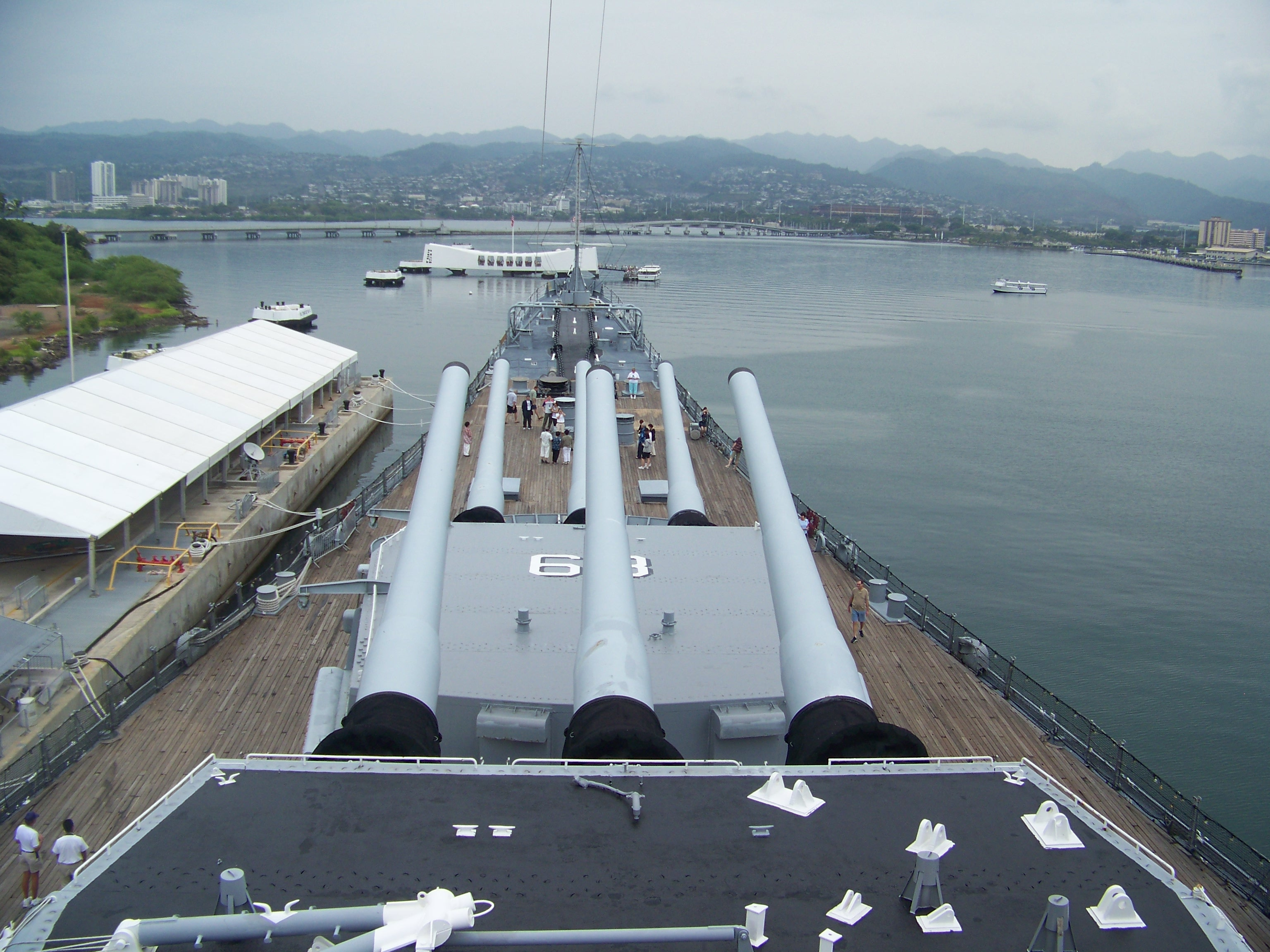
Photo from USS Missouri, looking towards the USS Arizona memorial

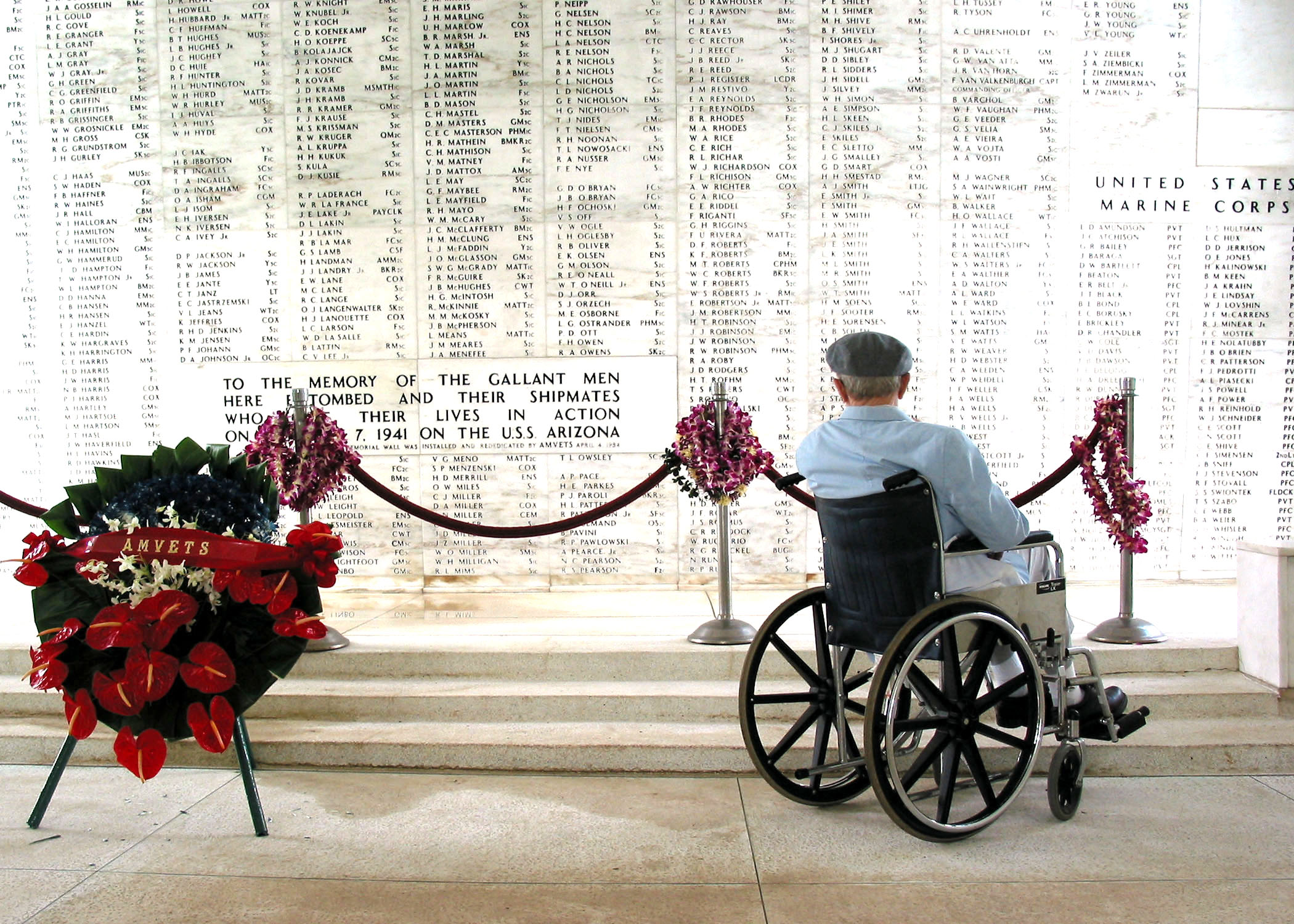
Pearl Harbor survivor Bill Johnson reads the list of names inscribed in the USS Arizona Memorial

- Remember Pearl Harbor (1942) A Republic Pictures B-movie, starring Don "Red" Barry, one of the first motion pictures to respond to the events.
- Air Force, a 1943 propaganda film depicting the fate of the crew of the Mary-Ann, one of the B-17 Flying Fortress bombers that flew into Hickam Field during the attack.
- December 7th: The Movie, directed by John Ford for the U.S. Navy in 1943, is a film that recreates the attacks of the Japanese forces. Footage from this Hollywood recreation has been mistakenly used as "actual attack footage", first by two different documentaries released in 1991 to mark the 50th anniversary of the attack, and again by television network CNN during an entertainment news report in 2001.
- From Here to Eternity (1953), an adaptation of the James Jones novel set in Hawaii on the eve of the attack.
- In Harm's Way (1965), director Otto Preminger's adaptation of the James Bassett novel, which opens on December 6, 1941, in Hawaii, and depicts the attack from the point of view of the men of a ship able to leave the harbor.
- Storm Over the Pacific, also known as Hawai Middouei daikaikusen: Taiheiyo no arashi (Hawaii-Midway Battle of the Sea and Sky: Storm in the Pacific Ocean) and I Bombed Pearl Harbor (1961), produced by the Japanese studio Toho Company and starring Toshiro Mifune, tells the story of Japanese airmen who served in the Pearl Harbor Raid and the Battle of Midway. An edited version dubbed into English as I Bombed Pearl Harbor was given U.S. release in 1961.
- The Time Tunnel, TV series; Season 1, Episode 4: "The Day the Sky Fell In" (1966). In the story, Tony attempts to save his father's life, but fails.
- Tora! Tora! Tora! (1970), a Japan-U.S. coproduction about the attack is "meticulous" in its approach to dissecting the situation leading up to the attack. It depicts the Japanese attack on Pearl Harbor from both American and Japanese points of view, with scrupulous attention to historical fact, including the U.S. use of Magic cryptanalysis.
- Pearl (1978), a TV miniseries, written by Stirling Silliphant, about events leading up to the attack.
- The Waltons TV series; Season 7, Episode 10: "Day Of Infamy", aired on the 37th anniversary of the bombing on December 7, 1978.
- Voyagers! TV series; "Sneak Attack", season 1, episode 14, original airdate February 13, 1983. The time travelers arrive at Pearl Harbor on December 7 and save the life of General Douglas MacArthur (who was actually in the Philippines at the time; the story has him attending a "top-secret meeting" at Pearl Harbor).
- The Winds of War, a novel by American writer Herman Wouk, was written between 1963 and 1971. The novel finishes in December 1941 with the aftermath of the attack. The TV miniseries based on the book was produced by Dan Curtis, airing in 1984. It starred Robert Mitchum and Ali MacGraw, with Ralph Bellamy as President Roosevelt.
- Pearl Harbor (2001), a love story set amidst the lead up to the attack and its aftermath.
- Medal of Honor: Rising Sun (2003), a first-person shooter video game developed by EA Los Angeles, depicts the attack on Pearl Harbor in its opening missions.
- Attack on Pearl Harbor (2007), a flight simulator based on the Attack on Pearl Harbor and the following Battles of Wake Island, Midway, and the Coral Sea. The game was re-released in 2010 as Pearl Harbor Trilogy – 1941: Red Sun Rising.
- Hacksaw Ridge (2016), depicts the life of Desmond Doss, who cited the attack as the reason for his involvement in World War II despite being a conscientious objector.
- Enemy Within (2019), depicts the Niʻihau Incident.
- Midway (2019), the Attack on Pearl Harbor is featured prominently in the first act of the film, mostly from the perspective of men on the deck of the USS Arizona as she explodes and sinks during the attack.
- Red Sun (2024), a Filipino war drama TV series that included the Attack on Pearl Harbor at the very end of episode 20.

== In non-fiction and historical media ==
FDR Pearl Harbor speech
Speech given before Joint Session of Congress in entirety. (3.1 MB, ogg/Vorbis format).
Read full text on Wikisource

"A date which will live in infamy"
Section of Pearl Harbor speech with famous phrase. (168 KB, ogg/Vorbis format).

- The Attack on Pearl Harbor: An Illustrated History by Larry Kimmett and Margaret Regis is a careful recreation of the "Day of Infamy" using maps, photos, unique illustrations, and an animated CD. From the early stages of Japanese planning, through the attack on Battleship Row, to the salvage of the U.S. Pacific fleet, this book provides a detailed overview of the attack.
- At Dawn We Slept: The Untold Story of Pearl Harbor by Gordon W. Prange is an extremely comprehensive account of the events leading up to the Pearl Harbor attack and is considered by most scholars to be the best single work about the raid. It is a balanced account that gives both the Japanese and American perspectives. Prange spent 37 years researching the book by studying documents about Pearl Harbor and interviewing surviving participants to attempt the most exhaustive account of what happened: the Japanese planning and execution, why U.S. intelligence failed to warn of it, and why a peace agreement was not attained. The book is the first in the so-called "Prange Trilogy" of Pearl Harbor books co-written with Donald Goldstein and Katherine Dillon, the other two being:
  - Pearl Harbor: The Verdict of History – a dissection of the various revisionist theories surrounding the attack.
  - December 7, 1941: The Day The Japanese Attacked Pearl Harbor – a recollection of the attack as narrated by eyewitnesses.
- Day of Infamy by Walter Lord was one of the most popular nonfiction accounts of the attack on Pearl Harbor.
- Pearl Harbor: Final Judgment by Henry C. Clausen and Bruce Lee tells of Clausen's top-secret investigation of the events leading up to the Pearl Harbor attack. Much of the information in this book was still classified when previous books were published.
- Pearl Harbor Countdown: Admiral James O. Richardson by Skipper Steely is an insightful and detailed account of the events leading up to the attack. Through his comprehensive treatment of the life and times of Admiral James O. Richardson, Steely explores four decades of American foreign policy, traditional military practice, U.S. intelligence, and the administrative side of the military, exposing the largely untold story of the events leading up to the Japanese attack.
- Pearl Harbor Papers: Inside the Japanese Plans, released by Goldstein and Dillon in 1993, used materials from Prange's library to further flesh out the Japanese perspective of the attack, including diaries from some officers and ship logs.
- Pearl Harbor: The Seeds and Fruits of Infamy by Percy L. Greaves, Jr. The first part provides a detailed history of pre-war U.S.-Japan relations, documenting the sources of rising tension. The second part suggests that the attack on Pearl Harbor was neither unexpected nor unprovoked.
- Pearl Survivors: Eyewitness Accounts in their own words by Dick Jensen. Jensen tells the stories of 18 servicemen who were stationed at Pearl Harbor the day of the attack. These are first-person accounts of what happened that day.
- The Last Zero Fighter, released in 2012, uses interviews conducted in Japanese, in Japan, with five Japanese aviators, three of whom participated in the Pearl Harbor strike: Kaname Harada, Haruo Yoshino and Takeshi Maeda. The aviators share their personal experiences (translated into English) in regards to their personal experiences training for and executing the raid on Pearl Harbor.

== In alternate history media ==
- The Final Countdown is a 1980 feature film in which the nuclear aircraft carrier USS Nimitz travels through time, arriving one day before the attack.
- The 1993 opening episode of the OVA series Konpeki no Kantai has (actual) IJN Admiral Isoroku Yamamoto thrown back in time from 1943 to 1905. Using his knowledge, Japan builds a large fleet with 1943 technology, successfully destroys the entire U.S. Pacific Fleet and lands amphibious forces in Hawaii – all in the space of December 7 and 8, 1941.
- William Sanders wrote the alternate history story "Billy Mitchell's Overt Act" in 1998. In the variant history, Billy Mitchell managed to avoid the 1925 court-martial which ended his military career, convinced the military to invest in aircraft carriers instead of battleships (as the real Mitchell had tried to do), did not die in 1936 and was still an active service general in 1941, correctly guessing Japanese intentions.
- Days of Infamy is a 2004 novel by Harry Turtledove in which the Japanese attack on Hawaii is a full-scale invasion. This borrows from a concept actually suggested by one of the key planners of the attack, Commander Minoru Genda, but turned down by senior IJN officers who realized it was impossible.

== See also ==
- Attack on Port Arthur (a surprise attack by Japan on the neutral Russian Empire naval fleet that started the Russo-Japanese War 37 years prior to Pearl Harbor)
- Bombing of Dublin in World War II (one of the few places in neutral countries bombed during the war)
- Operation K
- Air warfare of World War II
- Attack on Howland Island
- List of United States Navy ships present at Pearl Harbor, December 7, 1941
- List of Medal of Honor recipients for the Attack on Pearl Harbor
- Nagao Kita
- Edwin T. Layton
- National Pearl Harbor Remembrance Day
- Pearl Harbor Survivors Association
- Pearl Harbor advance-knowledge conspiracy theory
- Winds Code
