= Henry Clausen =

American lawyer (1905–1992)

Henry C. Clausen
- Born: June 30, 1905; San Francisco, California
- Died: December 4, 1992 (aged 87); San Francisco, California
- Burial place: Woodlawn Memorial Park Cemetery in Colma, San Mateo County, California
- Citizenship: American
- Notable work: The Clausen Report

Henry Christian Clausen (30 June 1905 – 4 December 1992) was an American lawyer, and investigator. He authored the Clausen Report, an 800-page report on the Army Board's Pearl Harbor Investigation. He traveled over 55,000 miles over seven months in 1945, and interviewed nearly a hundred personnel, Army, Navy, British and civilian, as a Special Investigator for the Secretary of War Henry L. Stimson carrying out an investigation ordered by Congress.

== Biography ==
Clausen, a lawyer and a former Assistant United States Attorney from San Francisco, and a "civilian at heart" had joined up "for the duration" of the war, being discharged in August 1945. He was not a Reserve officer. He had been the Trial Judge Advocate for the Army at the (well publicized) court martial of Army inspectors for fraudulent inspections of aircraft engines at the Wright Aeronautical engine manufacturing facility in Lockland, Ohio.

He was a Republican like Stimson, who Clausen regarded as "a man of truly heroic stature". Clausen wrote about Congressman's Gearhart's attack on him during the Congressional Hearing that "I was a Republican myself, and a fiscal conservative, too". He appeared before the Congressional Hearing, and was asked to show Congressman Murphy his Summary exhibit of Far Eastern documents, as Congressmen Ferguson and Gearhart who were in the "Kimmel camp" had held onto the two copies sent to the committee to prevent other members seeing them.

He decided to write the book Pearl Harbor: Final Judgement in 1991 (published in 1992) in opposition to what he described as “inaccurate conspiracy theories” of the Pearl Harbor attack.

== Clausen Report ==
Stimson got the Army Pearl Harbor Board report (actually two reports, with a second Top Secret section on codebreaking) on Pearl Harbor with its criticism of General George Marshall and Secretary of State Cordell Hull, but "fatally flawed" from crucial but withheld evidence and perjured testimony. The Board had only learned of the top-secret cryptography program Magic's existence a week before the report was finished, and was initially not allowed access to the Navy Hewitt report until an appeal was made to Navy Secretary Forrestal. The three generals on the Board had all been relieved of commands by Marshall, hence were prejudiced against him. But they were available, so were put on the list of available officers for the Board by Marshall.

After discussing the Board report(s) with General Cramer (the Judge Advocate General) and with Major (later Lt. Col) Clausen (who had been Assistant Recorder to the Army Board), Stimson appointed Clausen as his Special Investigator to retake evidence and follow unexplored leads. Clausen and Colonel Hughes decided to ask:

- What had Pearl Harbor 'known' about Japanese intentions before the attack?
- What had Pearl Harbor 'done' with this information before the attack?
- What had Washington 'known' about Japanese intentions before the attack?
- What had Washington 'done' with this information before the attack?

Clausen had an authorising letter from Stimson informing witnesses he had the necessary clearances to require their cooperation, but he was often lied to until he produced copies of about 40 top secret 'Magic' decrypts, to prove he had the proper clearance. Previously they had been required to lie under oath to protect the secret of 'Magic'. He wore the decrypts in a self-destructing bomb pouch to satisfy security concerns.

=== The Fourteen-part Telegram and The War Warning ===
Colonel Dusenbury, of the US Army SIS, testified that he received the fourteenth part (which said diplomatic relations would be broken) from the Navy (OP-20-G) about midnight (Washington time). No action was taken then; both Dusenbury and Commander Kramer, the translator, went home, and as much as nine vital hours (certainly three) were lost. The next morning Colonel Bratton arrived later on Sunday morning than he initially claimed during testimony and, Clausen concluded, invented a story about not being able to get in touch with Marshall which "nearly destroyed" Marshall.

Marshall got assurances that the final warning on December 7 would be received by everyone before 1 pm Washington time; he had to send Colonels Bratton and Bundy back to the message center twice to get this confirmation. But when Colonel French, in charge of the message center, learned that the War Department's radio system could not contact Pearl Harbor, he decided to send their message by RCA commercial radio – without telling Marshall of the delay.

=== The Pearl Harbor Commanders ===
According to Clausen,

- Lt. Gen. W. C. Short didn't want the command in Hawaii and failed to study what his task entailed. He failed to follow Washington's orders to liaise closely with the Navy, to conduct reconnaissance, or to get the radar equipment he had out of training mode (for several months), and he failed to alert his forces against attack as ordered.
- Adm. H. E. Kimmel withheld vital intelligence (e.g. the two messages about the destruction of codes and code machines by the Japanese, because he did not consider them as "being of vital importance") from his Army counterpart Short. Kimmel was inflexible in his convictions and expressions and would not liaise with the Army about its state of readiness.

Clausen criticises others; Dusenbury, Fielder, Bicknell, Layton, Turner, Mayfield, Bratton, Rochefort, Gerow, and Kramer. And Roosevelt, for often vacillating, and for making a number of telephone calls after reading the Japanese message, but not one to Marshall. He does not think that a Winds Execute message was received, though there were several false leads given in testimony to the various investigators, and the FCC did intercept an IJN execute order with respect to England after Pearl Harbor.

=== Final Judgment ===
Clausen saw the cause of being caught unprepared during the Pearl Harbor attack, as due both to having two separate commands at Pearl Harbor (Navy & Army), and to having two separate Intelligence organizations in Washington and elsewhere (Navy and Army), and so welcomed the combination of the Navy and Army efforts by Truman (eventually this came to be called NSA). MacArthur told him that he "had to barter like a rug merchant throughout the war to get the intelligence I have needed from the Navy." MacArthur also said that he got "ample and complete information" from the War Department prior to 7 December.

The arrangements in Washington prior to Pearl Harbor were inefficient and indicative of a peacetime mentality, e.g. the odd/even days arrangement for sharing cryptographic work between the Army and Navy. The Navy was sending intercepts by teletype, while the Army was using air mail before Dec 6. But the Navy only had Commander Kramer to distribute the material (with no relief for him) while the Army had both Colonels Bratton & Dusenbury. Clausen says that the breach of Magic security in the White House was that Magic documents were found in the desk of Roosevelt's military aide Maj. Gen Edwin M. 'Pa' Watson; not "in a wastebasket" as is often claimed.

=== Conclusions ===
Clausen disapproves of the policy amongst the cryptographers, and senior officers like Marshall, to lie under oath during the various investigations to keep Magic secret, but sympathizes with the quandary those officers faced in practice.

And he listed these people in terms of their culpability, based on a scale of zero to ten, with ten being the high end of the scale:

- 10 Walter Short
- 10 Husband Kimmel
- 9 Carlisle C. Dusenbury (see below)
- 8 Kendall Fielder
- 8 George Bicknell
- 8 Edwin Layton
- 8 Richmond Kelly Turner
- 8 Laurance Safford
- 7 Irving Mayfield
- 7 Rufus Bratton
- 6 Joseph Rochefort
- 6 Leonard Gerow
- 6 Alwin D. Kramer (see below)
- 5 President Franklin Roosevelt (particularly for calling others but not Marshall that night)

=== Carlisle Clyde Dusenbury ===
Lieutenant Colonel Carlisle Clyde Dusenbury was the Army G2 (Intelligence) officer at the Japan desk in Washington on Saturday 6 December 1941.

=== Alwin D. Kramer ===
Lieutenant Commander Alwin D. Kramer was the US Navy translator in Washington on Saturday 6 December 1941. He was also responsible for distributing MAGIC information to the President; though unlike the Army (with Dusenbury and Bratton) he had no relief officer.

== Freemasonry ==
Clausen achieved the 33rd Degree of the Scottish Rite, and played a pivotal role, serving as both Grand Master of California as well as Grand Commander of the Supreme Council, Southern Jurisdiction, of the Ancient and Accepted Scottish Rite of Freemasonry. In this capacity, he authored several books discussing freemasonry, all of which were published by the Supreme Council, 33°, Ancient and Accepted Scottish Rite of Freemasonry.

== Bibliography ==
=== Reports ===
- Report of Investigation by Lt. Colonel, Henry C. Clausen, JAGD, for the Secretary of War, Supplementary to Proceedings of the Army Pearl Harbor Board (Washington: United States Government Printing Office, 1946)

=== Books ===
- Stanford's Judge Crothers: The Life Story of George E. Crothers, Faithful Son, Loyal Citizen and Political Leader, Successful Lawyer, Jurist and Businessman, Wise Counseler and Kindly Benefactor (George E. Crothers Trust, 1967) OCLC 1647554
- The Clausen Letters: Separation of Church and State, A White Paper on Religious Liberty (Supreme Council, 33⁰, Ancient and Accepted Scottish Rite of Freemasonry, Mother Jurisdiction of the World, 1970) 24 pages OCLC 7417926
- Clausen's Commentaries on Morals and Dogma (Supreme Council, 33⁰, Ancient and Accepted Scottish Rite of Freemasonry, Mother Jurisdiction of the World, 1974) OCLC 1229639 (Internet Archive)
- Masons Who Helped Shape Our Nation (Supreme Council, 33⁰, Ancient and Accepted Scottish Rite of Freemasonry, Southern Jurisdiction, USA, 1976) 112 pages OCLC 2392477 ISBN 978-1127512546
- Messages for a Mission (Supreme Council, 33⁰, Ancient and Accepted Scottish Rite of Freemasonry, Mother Jurisdiction of the World, 1977) 227 pages OCLC 3379986
- Why Public School? (Supreme Council, 33⁰, Ancient and Accepted Scottish Rite of Freemasonry, Mother Jurisdiction of the World, 1979) 78 pages OCLC 6442591
- Beyond the Ordinary: Towards a Better, Wiser and a Happier World (Supreme Council, 33⁰, Ancient and Accepted Scottish Rite of Freemasonry, Mother Jurisdiction of the World, 1983) 298 pages OCLC 10682732
- Emergence of the Mystical (Supreme Council, 33⁰, Ancient and Accepted Scottish Rite of Freemasonry, Mother Jurisdiction of the World, 1981) 80 pages OCLC 7417926
- Your Amazing Mystic Powers (Supreme Council, 33⁰, Ancient and Accepted Scottish Rite of Freemasonry, Mother Jurisdiction of the World, 1985) 105 pages OCLC 13794140
- Stability, Strength and Serenity (Supreme Council, 33⁰, Ancient and Accepted Scottish Rite of Freemasonry, Mother Jurisdiction of the World, 1987) 192 pages OCLC 23671282
- Pearl Harbor: Final Judgement, with Bruce Lee (New York: Crown Publishers, 1992) 485 pages OCLC 25508800 ISBN 0-517-58644-4 (Internet Archive)

=== Books by Other Authors ===
- Pearl Harbor: Selected Testimonies, Fully Indexed, from the Congressional Hearings (1945-1946) and Prior Investigations of the Events Leading up to the Attack (McFarland & Co., 1993) 402 pages ISBN 0899508111 (Internet Archive)

== See also ==
- Morals and Dogma of the Ancient and Accepted Scottish Rite of Freemasonry
