= Winds Code =

Military intelligence incident

The "Winds Code" is a confused military intelligence episode relating to the 1941 attack on Pearl Harbor, especially the advance-knowledge debate claiming that the attack was expected.

The Winds Code was an instruction from Tokyo to Japanese legations worldwide that diplomatic relations were in danger of being ruptured. While the code was set up, the problem is whether the code was ever transmitted or not. Amid all the other indicators of approaching conflict, it seems likely that the message was never sent, or at least never recorded at a high level in the US command structure.

In any case a code message in a news or weather programs was not needed, as ordinary commercial communication facilities were available to Japan right up to the December 7 attack. Pearl Harbor historians Gordon Prange and Roberta Wholstetter sidestep the issue by saying that the intercepted codes-destruct messages of 2 December were a more accurate indication of war breaking out. Both Henry Clausen and John Costello see the Winds Code controversy as a red herring and coming close to disinformation (Clausen) or only as an alert to legations (Costello).

The code was set up, so that in case of an emergency leading to the interruption of regular communication channels, a coded message would be inserted into the daily Japanese international news broadcast. Concealed within the meteorological reports, and repeated twice, would be "East wind rain" ("Higashi no kaze ame"), "West wind clear" ("Nishi no kaze hare") or "North wind cloudy" ("Kitano kaze kumori"), the first indicating an imminent major breach with the United States, the second a break with the British (including the invasion of Thailand); the third indicating a break with the Soviet Union. Presumably if sent both the first and second messages would have been sent, the third referring to the Soviet Union would not have been applicable in 1941.

The signal setting up the code was intercepted and broken by USN cryptographer Commander Laurance Safford at OP-20-G in Washington. Consequently, a close monitoring of the Japanese daily shortwave broadcasts was instituted for the codes, dubbed the Winds Code by the Americans.

USN Chief Warrant Officer Ralph T. Briggs, an operator at Station M, the Navy's East Coast intercept installation at Cheltenham in Maryland, stated he logged "Higashi no kaze ame" ("East wind rain") on the morning of December 4; this was transmitted to the Fleet Intelligence Office at Pearl through the secure TWX line. Briggs was subsequently given a four-day pass as a reward (and was away in Cleveland on the 7th). At the FIO, Commander Laurance Safford states he reported this message to his superiors in Washington. At this point there is no further record of the message. Some eight other Army and Navy officers testified that they, too, had seen a winds execute message. But two of the men completely reversed their original testimony and the others turned out to have only vague recollections.

None of the official inquiries took Safford's statement as fact; the most generous reporting that he was "misled" and that his memory was faulty. His case was not helped by his uncertainty over the date, although Lt Alwin Kramer also agreed in 1944 that he had seen Safford's yellow teletype sheet.

It has been claimed that in the week after the attack there was significant document 'loss' at the Office of Naval Intelligence in Washington. In 2008 historians from the National Security Agency went back and analyzed all American and foreign intelligence sources and decrypted cables. They came to the conclusion that "winds execute" message never reached Washington. If there was a message then the blame would fall on the military for not passing it on.

Following the end of the war, Japanese officials advised General MacArthur that no Winds signal was ever sent relating to the United States. This is supported by the testimony of Commander Joseph Rochefort (based in Naval HQ in Pearl Harbor). However an American intelligence team in Japan led by Colonel Abraham Sinkov of Central Bureau in September and October 1945 found they were told "half-truths or outright lies" by Japanese intelligence specialists, partly as there were rumours that the Americans would execute those involved in intelligence. The team was not allowed to reveal American intelligence successes. However some Japanese (Arisue and Nishimura) were more forthcoming when they saw that the Americans were interested in Japanese help against the Soviets.

The coded Winds message was reported from Hong Kong, late on Sunday, December 7, local time. The signal was "higashi no kaze, ame; nishi no kaze, hare" ("Easterly wind, rain; Westerly wind, fine"); meaning that Japan was about to declare war on Britain and America (and attacked British Malaya before Hawaii). A skeleton staff had been left behind in Hong Kong when the British Far East Combined Bureau (FECB) moved to Singapore in August 1939.

In 2009 the NSA published "West Winds Clear" showing the Winds Message was never sent
