= Wilfred Holmes =

American naval officer, engineering professor, author

Wilfred J. Holmes
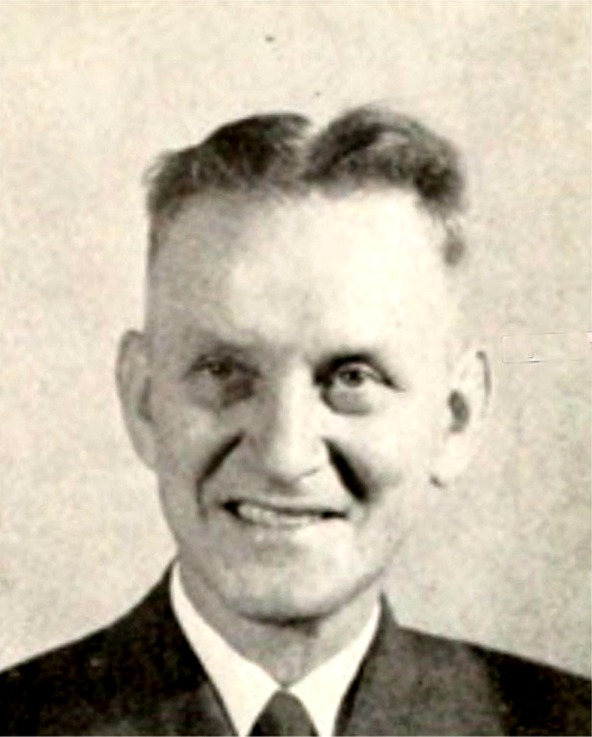
- Born: April 4, 1900; Stockport, New York, U.S.
- Died: January 7, 1986 (aged 85); Honolulu, Hawaii, U.S.
- Education: US Naval Academy; Columbia University
- Occupations: US naval Officer; professor; author
- Known for: Naval intelligence analysis university professor/ administrator
- Spouse: Isabelle West Holmes
- Children: John Eric Holmes

Wilfred J. "Jasper" Holmes (April 4, 1900 – January 7, 1986) was a US Naval officer, one of the Station HYPO staff, who had the idea of faking a water supply failure on Midway Island in 1942. He suggested using an unencrypted emergency warning, in the hope of provoking a Japanese response, thus establishing whether Midway was a target.

== Early years ==
Born in Stockport, New York, Holmes was the son of Johan Erik Jonasson Holmes, a Finnish immigrant who worked as a fireman in a paper mill, and Esther F. Holmes. Wilfred Holmes graduated from the US Naval Academy, Annapolis, 1922, and had a master's degree in engineering from Columbia University. He served as a line officer in the Navy, in submarines. He wrote submarine adventure stories for the Saturday Evening Post and technical articles under the pen name Alec Hudson.

One of the former, "Rendezvous", imagined an air raid in which flying boats were refueled by submarines at a Pacific atoll, allowing them to reach targets which would normally be well outside their range. This scenario later played out in real life in the form of Operation K, a March 1942 attack by Japanese H8Ks on Pearl Harbor. Unlike the massive carrier-based surprise attack three months earlier, this only involved two aircraft and failed due to bad weather. Naval Intelligence chief Edwin T. Layton later concluded that the Japanese had made use of the idea from "Rendezvous" when planning the operation.

Holmes retired from the Navy in 1936 because of arthritis of the spine, and joined the faculty of the University of Hawaii.

== Intelligence officer ==
In 1941, Lieutenant Holmes was recalled to duty and assigned to Station HYPO, which was breaking Japanese codes, especially their naval cipher JN-25. He was promoted to lieutenant commander on February 25, 1942.

By May 1942, US Naval Intelligence knew that the Japanese were planning an attack at a spot they called AF, but did not know what AF signified. Navy cryptanalyst Joseph Rochefort thought AF was Midway Island. Holmes had the idea of faking a water supply failure on Midway. He suggested using an unencrypted emergency warning, in the hope of provoking a Japanese response, thus establishing whether AF was Midway. Holmes' ruse worked and led to the Japanese defeat at the Battle of Midway. Holmes was awarded the Distinguished Service Medal.

Continuing to work at Station HYPO, Holmes was promoted to commander on May 8, 1943, and then to captain on December 19, 1944.

== Later years ==
Holmes became chairman of the department of engineering and mathematics at the University of Hawaii after the war, then Dean of Engineering, Dean of Administration, and Vice President, retiring from the university in 1965. Holmes Hall is named in his honor. He was author of books on submarine warfare and naval intelligence.

== Death ==
Holmes died on January 7, 1986, and is buried in the National Memorial Cemetery of the Pacific, Honolulu.
