= Agnes Meyer Driscoll =

American cryptographer (1889–1971)

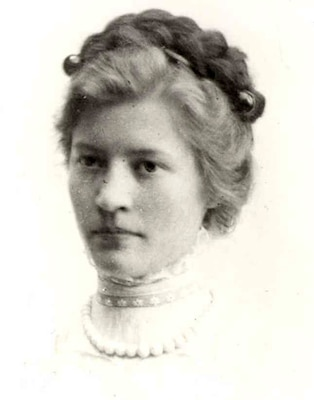
- Agnes Meyer, aged 21
- Born: Agnes May Meyer; July 24, 1889; Geneseo, Illinois, United States
- Died: September 16, 1971 (aged 82)
- Other names: Miss Aggie; Madame X
- Education: Otterbein College; Ohio State University

Agnes Meyer Driscoll (July 24, 1889 – September 16, 1971), known as "Miss Aggie" or "Madame X'", was an American cryptanalyst during both World War I and World War II and was known as "the first lady of naval cryptology."

== Early years ==
Driscoll was born Agnes May Meyer in Geneseo, Illinois, in 1889. She moved with her family to Westerville, Ohio, in 1895, where her father, Gustav Meyer, had taken a job teaching music at Otterbein College. In 1909, he donated the family home to the Anti-Saloon League, which had recently moved its headquarters to Westerville. The home was later donated to the Westerville Public Library and is now home to the Anti-Saloon League Museum and the Westerville Local History Center.

== Education ==
Driscoll attended Otterbein College from 1907 to 1909. In 1911, she received a Bachelor of Arts degree from the Ohio State University, having majored in mathematics and physics and studied foreign languages, statistics and music. She was fluent in English, French, German, Latin and Japanese. From her earliest days as a college student, she pursued technical and scientific studies. After graduation, she moved to Amarillo, Texas, where she lived from 1911 to 1918 and worked as director of music at a military academy and, later, chair of the mathematics department at the local high school.

== 1918–1939 ==
On June 22, 1918, about one year after America entered World War I when America had just started allowing women to enlist, Driscoll enlisted in the United States Navy. She was recruited at the highest possible rank of chief yeoman and after some time in the Postal Cable and Censorship Office she was assigned to the Code and Signal section of the Director of Naval Communications. After the war ended, she made use of an option to continue working at her post as a civilian. Except for a two-year break, when she worked for a private firm, she remained a leading cryptanalyst for the U.S. Navy until 1949.

In 1920, while continuing to work with the Navy, Driscoll studied at the Riverbank Laboratories in Geneva, Illinois, where fellow code breakers, including William F. Friedman and Elizebeth Smith Friedman worked. She is known to have also worked at the American Black Chamber run by Herbert Yardley. This was the first U.S. peace time code-breaking agency which set out to break codes used in diplomatic correspondence.

Her efforts were not limited to manual systems; she was involved also in the emerging machine technology of the time, which was being applied both to making and breaking ciphers. In her first days in the Code and Signal section, she co-developed one of the U.S. Navy's cipher machines, the "Communications Machine". This cipher machine became a standard enciphering device for the Navy for most of the 1920s. In recognition of her work, the United States Congress awarded Driscoll $15,000, which she shared with the widow of the machine's co-inventor, William Greshem.

In 1923, the inventor Edward Hebern, creator of the fledgling Hebern Electric Code Company, was attempting to create a more secure rotor-driven cipher machine. Driscoll left the Navy to test the machine, but it failed to deliver a more secure encryption system. She returned to the Navy in spring 1924.

In August 1924, she married Michael Driscoll, a Washington, D.C. lawyer.

Driscoll, with Lieutenant Joseph Rochefort, broke the Japanese Navy manual code, the Red Book Code, in 1926 after three years of work and helped to break the Blue Book Code in 1930.

In early 1935, Driscoll led the attack on the Japanese M-1 cipher machine (also known to the U.S. as the ORANGE machine), which was used to encrypt the messages of Japanese naval attaches around the world.

In 1939, she made important inroads into JN-25, the Japanese fleet's operational code used for the most important of messages. She successfully solved the cipher component of the "5-num" system which used number groups as substitutes for words and numbers which was further encrypted with a digital cipher. After that, the Navy could read some standard format messages, such as weather reports, but the bulk of the messages remained to be discovered. This work was later developed and exploited after the attack on Pearl Harbor for the rest of the Pacific War and provided advance warning of the Japanese attack on Midway Atoll. She was unable to take part in this work because, in October 1940, she was transferred to a team working to break the German naval Enigma cipher.

During this period, Driscoll mentored the following naval cryptographers:

- Joseph Rochefort
- Thomas Dyer
- Edwin T. Layton
- Joseph Wenger

== 1940–1959 ==
After starting the work against JN-25, Driscoll was transferred to a new group, which attacked the German Enigma ciphers using a catalog approach (similar to rainbow tables). After almost two years of work on her new assignment, Driscoll and her team were unable to make progress in solving the German device. That was partly due to her unwillingness to use machine support or a mathematical approach, but she also refused the help of British code breakers from Bletchley Park who had traveled to the United States to advise her. Besides, the US and UK did not communicate effectively and her approach was both fruitless and had been tried by the British, who determined that it was unlikely to work. Ultimately this work was superseded by the US-UK cryptologic exchanges of 1942–43.

In 1943, she worked with a team to break the Japanese cipher Coral. It was broken two months later, although Driscoll is said to have had little influence on the project.

In 1945, she appears to have worked on attacking Russian ciphers.

Driscoll was part of the navy contingent that joined the new national cryptologic agencies, firstly the Armed Forces Security Agency in 1949 and then the National Security Agency in 1952. While with the Armed Forces Security Agency she may have contributed to attacking a cipher called Venona.

From 1946 until her retirement from the National Security Agency, she filled a number of positions, but she did not advance to the ranks of senior leadership.

She retired from National Security Agency in 1959.

== Death ==
She died in 1971 and is buried in Arlington National Cemetery.

== Honors ==
In 2000, she was inducted into the National Security Agency's Hall of Honor. In 2017, an Ohio Historical Marker was placed in front of the Meyer home in Westerville honoring Agnes Meyer Driscoll and her achievements, referring to her as "the first lady of naval cryptology."

== Bibliography ==
- Johnson, Kevin Wade (2015). The Neglected Giant: Agnes Meyer Driscoll. Center for Cryptologic History Special Series, Volume 10. Washington, DC: National Security Agency: Center for Cryptologic History.
