= OP-20-G =

WWII US Navy signals intelligence group

- Active: July 1, 1922 - July 10, 1946
- Allegiance: United States
- Branch: United States Navy
- Type: Code and Signal Section
- Role: Signals intelligence Cryptanalysis
- Garrison/HQ: Navy Department building, Washington, D.C.

Commanders
- Notable commanders: Captain Laurance Safford; Captain Joseph Rochefort; Captain John R. Redman

OP-20-G or "Office of Chief Of Naval Operations (OPNAV), 20th Division of the Office of Naval Communications, G Section / Communications Security", was the U.S. Navy's signals intelligence and cryptanalysis group during World War II. Its mission was to intercept, decrypt, and analyze naval communications from Japanese, German, and Italian navies. In addition OP-20-G also copied diplomatic messages of many foreign governments. The majority of the section's effort was directed towards Japan and included breaking the early Japanese "Blue" book fleet code. This was made possible by intercept and High Frequency Direction Finder (HFDF) sites in the Pacific, Atlantic, and continental U.S., as well as a Japanese telegraphic code school for radio operators in Washington, D.C.

== Prewar ==
The Code and Signal Section was formally made a part of the Division of Naval Communications (DNC), as Op-20-G, on July 1, 1922. In January 1924, a 34-year-old U.S. Navy lieutenant named Laurance F. Safford was assigned to expand OP-20-G's domain to radio interception. He worked out of Room 2646, on the top floor of the Navy Department building in Washington, D.C.

Japan was of course a prime target for radio interception and cryptanalysis, but there was the problem of finding personnel who could speak Japanese. The Navy had a number of officers who had served in a diplomatic capacity in Japan and could speak Japanese fluently, but there was a shortage of radiotelegraph operators who could read Japanese Wabun code communications sent in kana. Fortunately, a number of US Navy and Marine radiotelegraph operators operating in the Pacific had formed an informal group in 1923 to compare notes on Japanese kana transmissions. Four of these men became instructors in the art of reading kana transmissions when the Navy began conducting classes in the subject in 1928.

The classes were conducted by the Room 2646 crew, and the radiotelegraph operators became known as the "On-The-Roof Gang". By June 1940, OP-20-G included 147 officers, enlisted men, and civilians, linked into a network of radio listening posts as far-flung as the Army's.

OP-20-G did some work on Japanese diplomatic codes, but the organization's primary focus was on Japanese military codes. The US Navy first got a handle on Japanese naval codes in 1922, when Navy agents broke into the Japanese consulate in New York City, cracked the safe, took photographs of pages of a Japanese navy codebook, and left, having put everything back as they had found it.

Before the war, the Navy cipher bureau operated out of three main bases:

- Station NEGAT at headquarters in Washington, D.C.
- Station HYPO (or FRUPAC), a section at Pearl Harbor in Hawaii
- Station CAST, a section in the fortified caves of the island of Corregidor, in the Philippines, with codebreakers and a network of listening and radio direction finding stations.
- FRUMEL was established in Melbourne when Navy signals intelligence personnel from the Philippines were evacuated to Australia. Evacuated Army signals intelligence personnel went to the Central Bureau.

The US Army Signal Intelligence Service (SIS) and OP-20-G were hobbled by bureaucracy and rivalry, competing with each other to provide their intelligence data, codenamed "MAGIC", to high officials. Complicating matters was that the Coast Guard, the FBI, and even the FCC also had radio-intercept operations.

The Navy organization at OP-20-G was more conventionally hierarchical than the Army at Arlington Hall which went more on merit rather than rank (like Bletchley Park), though commissions were handed out to "civilians in uniform" with rank according to age (an ensign for 28 or under, a lieutenant to 35 or a lieutenant commander if over 35). But control was by "regular military types". The Navy wanted the Army to forbid civilians to touch the SIGABA cipher machine like the Navy; though it was developed by a civilian (William Friedman). A Royal Navy visitor and intercept specialist Commander Sandwith reported in 1942 on "the dislike of Jews prevalent in the US Navy (while) nearly all the leading Army cryptographers are Jews".

In 1940, SIS and OP-20-G came to agreement with guide lines for handling MAGIC; the Army was responsible on even-numbered days and the Navy on odd-numbered days. So, on the first minute after midnight on 6 December 1941 the Navy took over. But USN Lt-Comdr Alwin Kramer had no relief officer (unlike the Army, with Dusenbury and Bratton); and that night was being driven around by his wife. He was also responsible for distributing MAGIC information to the President; in January 1941 the Army agreed that they would supply the White House in January, March, May, July, September and November and the Navy in February, April, June, August, October and December. But in May 1941 MAGIC documents were found in the desk of Roosevelt's military aide Edwin "Pa" Watson and the Navy took over; while the Army provided MAGIC to the State Department instead.

The result was that much of the MAGIC intelligence was delayed or unused. There was no efficient process for assessing and organizing the intelligence, as was provided postwar by a single intelligence agency.

== Attack on Pearl Harbor ==
In the early hours of the morning of 7 December 1941, the U.S. Navy communications intercept station at Fort Ward on Bainbridge Island, Washington, picked up a radio message being sent by the Japanese government to the Japanese embassy in Washington, D.C. It was the last in a series of 14 messages that had been sent over the previous 18 hours.

The messages were decrypted by a PURPLE analogue machine at OP-20-G and passed to the SIS for translation from Japanese, early on the morning of December 7. Army Colonel Rufus S. Bratton and Navy Lieutenant Commander Alwin Kramer independently inspected the decrypts.

The decrypts instructed the Japanese ambassador to Washington to inform the US Secretary of State, Cordell Hull, at 1:00 PM Washington time that negotiations between the United States and Japan were ended. The embassy was then to destroy their cipher machines. This sounded like war, and although the message said nothing about any specific military action, Kramer also realized that the sun would be rising over the expanses of the central and western Pacific by that time. The two men both tried to get in touch with Army Chief of Staff General George C. Marshall.

After some agonizing delays, Marshall got the decrypts and methodically examined them. He realized their importance and sent a warning to field commanders, including Major General Walter Short, the Army commander in Hawaii. However, Marshall was reluctant to use the telephone because he knew that telephone scramblers weren't very secure and sent it by less direct channels. Due to various constraints and bumblings, Short got the message many hours after the Japanese bombs had smashed the US Navy's fleet at anchor in Pearl Harbor.

== After Pearl Harbor ==
In February 1942 power struggles within the Navy resulted in the sidelining of Laurance Safford, with the support of Admirals Ernest King and Richmond K. Turner (and Joseph Redman) for the centralizing of control of naval intercept and codebreaking in Washington. So two new sections were headed by John R. Redman (Communications Combat Intelligence section) and Joseph Wenger (Communications Cryptanalytical section; to handle decryption and translation). Safford was shifted to an administrative support and cryptographic research role; thus was sidelined for the remainder of the war, as ultimately was Joseph Rochefort in Hawaii.

With Japanese advances in the Philippines, a possible invasion of Hawaii, and greater demand for intelligence, OP-20-G undertook two courses of action:

- The staff and services of CAST were progressively transferred to a newly formed US-Australian-British station, FRUMEL in Melbourne, Australia.
- Another signals intelligence center, known as NEGAT was formed in Washington, using elements of OP-20-G headquarters.

=== Naval Communications Annex ===
In Summer 1942 the Navy went through the motions of perhaps co-locating with the Army's SIS but Commander Joseph Wenger had picked out the "perfect new home" for the rapidly expanding OP-20-G and commandeered a private girls' school Mount Vernon College for Women for $800,000 (a fraction of what the buildings and grounds were worth), in 1944, compensated $1.038 million. So on 7 February 1943 it opened at what was called the "Naval Communications Annex", and staff moved in over the next two months.

== Section evolution ==
- (July 1922-March 1935) Code and Signal Section (Op-20-G), Division of Naval Communications (DNC), OCNO (July 1922-March 1935).
- (March 1935-March 1939) Communications Security Group (Op-20-G), DNC, OCNO
- (March 1939-September 1939) Radio Intelligence Section (Op-20-G), DNC, OCNO
- (October 1939-February 1942) Communications Security Section (Op-20-G), DNC, OCNO
- (February 1942-October 1942) Radio Intelligence Section (Op-20-G), DNC, OCNO
- (October 1942-July 1946) Communications Intelligence Organization (Op-20-G), DNC, OCNO
- July 10, 1946 All Naval communications intelligence elements were collectively designated "Communications Supplementary Activities" of the 20th Division of the Office of Naval Communications, Section 2, (Op-20-2)

== See also ==
- Andrew Gleason, one of the OP-20-G members during World War II
- Fleet Radio Unit
- United States Naval Computing Machine Laboratory
- Signal Intelligence Service (SIS)
- United States Coast Guard Unit 387
