= John B. Ackerman =

United States Air Force general

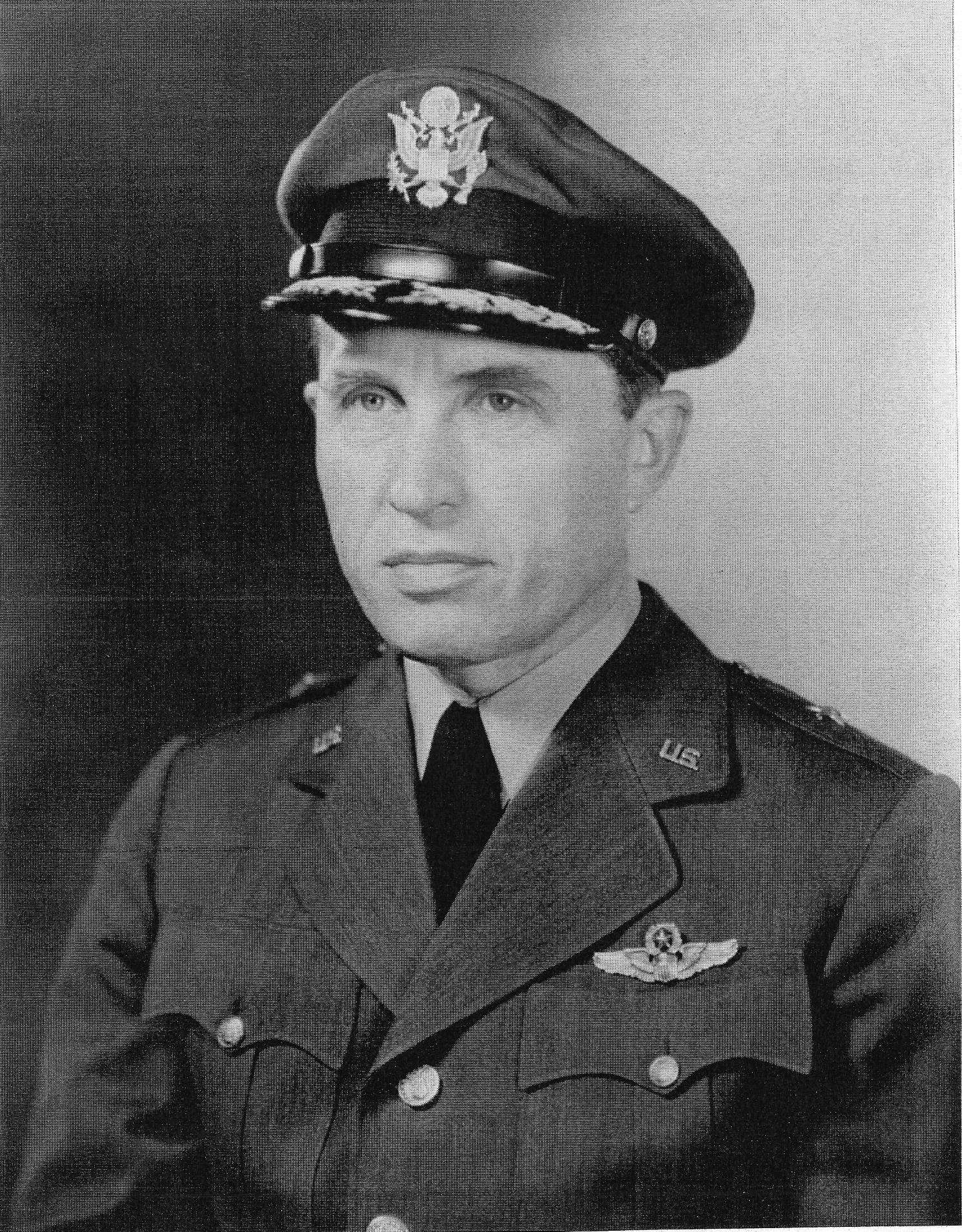
- Born: John Bevier Ackerman; April 29, 1909; Auburn, New York, U.S.
- Died: June 13, 1981 (aged 72); Beaufort, South Carolina, U.S.
- Military career
- Allegiance: United States of America
- Branch: United States Air Force
- Service years: 1932–1960
- Rank: Major general
- Nickname: Ack Ack
- Commands: Thirteenth Air Force 1956–1958; USAFSS 1958–1960 (deputy cmndr); Vice-Director of the National Security Agency
- Conflicts: World War II; Cold War

John Bevier Ackerman (April 29, 1909 – June 13, 1981) was the second vice director of the National Security Agency of the United States and a major general of the United States Air Force.

== Early life ==
Ackerman was born April 28, 1909, in Auburn, New York, the son of John Walter Ackerman (1867–1955) and Bertha H. Vedder Ackerman (1877–1978). He had an older brother, Lauren Ackerman, and a younger sister, Helen Ackerman Stokinger.

Through his father, Ackerman is a descendant of the New York DeWitt family, making him a distant cousin of New York State Governor DeWitt Clinton. He is also a descendant of New Paltz, New York patentees, or founders, Louis Bevier, Simon LeFevre, and Christian Deyo. His middle name comes from his paternal great-grandmother, Maria Bevier DeWitt (1811–1877). His 3rd great-grandfather, Johannes Bevier (1724–1797), was supervisor of the town of Rochester, New York in 1778.

At the time of the 1910 and 1920 United States Census recordings, the family was still living in Auburn. Around 1924, the family moved to Watertown, New York, after Ackerman's father took the Watertown city manager position. The 1930 United States Census shows the family living in Watertown.

John graduated from Watertown High School in 1926. He was a member of the New York National Guard which enabled him to gain appointment to the United States Military Academy in July 1928. He graduated 53rd out of 262 in 1932.

== Military career ==
Ackerman entered school at Randolph Air Force Base in Texas in 1933, graduating in June 1935. He was first assigned to Kelly Field in San Antonio, Texas, and the 1940 United States Census states that was his residence in 1935. He was then assigned to Maxwell Field in Alabama.

In 1938, he entered the California Institute of Technology in Pasadena, California, where after a year's worth of study he earned a degree of Master of Science and aeronautics of aviation meteorology.

In 1940, Ackerman, at this point promoted to captain, served as station weather officer and assistant operations manager at Chanute Field in Illinois. The 1940 Census states him living in Rantoul, Illinois, with his wife Virginia and their son Laurens.

Following this assignment, Captain Ackerman was sent back to the California Institute of Technology with three others for research on a project concerning long-range weather forecasts. He then helped to form the Air Corps Weather Service.

Promoted again, now Colonel Ackerman was assigned to the China-Burma-India theater during World War II to serve as a planner for General George E. Stratemeyer.

From 1945 to 1946, Colonel Ackerman was assistant chief of staff, plans, for the Continental Air Forces. From 1950 to 1953, Colonel Ackerman was deputy director of intelligence. Following this, from 1953 to 1956, he served as vice director of the National Security Agency, during which time he was also promoted to Major General.

Towards the end of his career, from 1956 to 1958, General Ackerman became commander of the Thirteenth Air Force, stationed in the Philippines. Upon his return to the United States in 1958, General Ackerman was named deputy commander of the Air Force Security Service stationed in San Antonio, Texas, the location of one of his first military assignments. He would retire in 1960.

== Death and burial ==
General Ackerman died on June 13, 1981, in Beaufort, South Carolina at the age of 72. He was laid to rest in the All Saints Churchyard, located at All Saints Church, Hollingbourne in Kent, England.

== Personal life ==
Ackerman married firstly Virginia Beech Svarz on September 8, 1934, in Los Angeles County, California. They had a son, Laurens Vedder Ackerman (born 1938).

Ackerman married secondly Anne Faith Donaldson D'Oench on December 28, 1945, in Carson City, Nevada. They had a son, Allan Douglas Ackerman (born 1947).

Preceded by Joseph Wenger	Vice Director of the National Security Agency; November 1953 – June 1956	Succeeded by John A. Samford
