= Fleet Radio Unit =

Fleet Radio Units (FRU) were the major centers for Allied cryptological and signals intelligence during the Pacific Campaign of World War II. Initially two FRUs were established in the Pacific, one at Pearl Harbor, Hawaii, called Station HYPO or FRUPAC (Fleet Radio Unit, Pacific), and the other, called Station CAST or Belconnen, at Cavite Naval Yard, then Corregidor, Philippines. With the fall of the Philippines to Imperial Japanese forces in April and May 1942, CAST personnel were evacuated to a newly established FRU at Melbourne, Australia, called FRUMEL (Fleet Radio Unit, Melbourne).

HYPO and FRUMEL supervised detached field units scattered at various locations and aboard ships throughout the south, central, and north Pacific areas until the end of World War II. A third center, NEGAT, was based at OP-20-G headquarters in Washington DC. The entire cryptanalysis effort conducted by the units was called Operation Magic. Liaison between the units and with the Far East Combined Bureau (FECB; the British signals intelligence center at Colombo, Ceylon in 1942) was titled Copek.
