= Tex Biard =

Navy code breaker

Captain Forrest Rosecrans "Tex" Biard (December 21, 1912, in Bonham, Texas – November 2, 2009) was an American linguist in the U.S. Navy codebreaking organization during the Second World War. A pre-war student of Japanese, Biard's translation work is considered to have been an important part of American military success.

== Early life and education ==
Biard graduated from North Dallas High School in 1930 and from the United States Naval Academy in 1934. He served as an ensign on the heavy cruiser USS New Orleans from 1935 to 1937. Biard was sent to Tokyo in 1939 for full-immersion Japanese language and culture training. His planned three-year assignment was cut short in September 1941 due to the rising tensions between Japan and the United States. Biard later earned a master's degree in physics from the Ohio State University in 1953.

== World War II service ==
In September 1941, Biard (then a lieutenant) was stationed at Pearl Harbor as a senior linguist for Station HYPO, part of American attempts to break Japanese military codes, including the key strategic code, JN-25. In February 1942, he was temporarily assigned to the USS Yorktown as the radio intelligence officer under Admiral Frank Jack Fletcher. His translation and decryption work on JN-25 contributed substantially to Allied efforts in the Battle of the Coral Sea and the Battle of Midway. He was promoted to lieutenant commander on March 1, 1943.

Biard was promoted to commander on February 1, 1944. He then worked with Tom Mackie to decrypt and translate captured Japanese Army code books for Douglas MacArthur; MacArthur was able to use Biard and Mackie's data to accelerate his "island-hopping" strategy to liberate New Guinea and hasten the end of the war.

== Postwar career ==
In 1946, Biard served as executive officer in the Intelligence Division and Chief of the Security Section for Operation Crossroads, the first nuclear weapons tests conducted by Joint Army/Navy Task Force One at Bikini Atoll.

Biard retired from the U.S. Navy in January 1955 and received a promotion to captain based on his wartime service record. After retirement, he taught physics at Long Beach City College.

Biard was interred along with his wife Winifred in Arlington National Cemetery on January 20, 2010.
