= Communications Machine =

The Communications Machine, or "CM", is a mechanical device used by the United States Navy for most of the 1920s. It used a sliding alphabet system. It was developed by Agnes Meyer Driscoll and William Gresham. In 1937 the United States Congress recognized the achievement of these two by awarding them both $15,000.
