= Laurance Safford =

American cryptographer (1908–1998)

Laurance Frye Safford
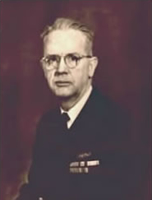
- Born: October 22, 1893; Somerville, Massachusetts, US
- Died: May 15, 1973 (aged 79); Bethesda, Maryland, US
- Military career
- Allegiance: United States
- Branch: United States Navy
- Service years: 1916–1953
- Rank: Captain
- Commands: Assistant Director of Naval Communications for Cryptographic Research
- Conflicts: World War I World War II
- Awards: Legion of Merit

Captain, U.S.N. Laurance Frye Safford (October 22, 1893 – May 15, 1973) was a U.S. Navy cryptologist. He established the Naval cryptologic organization after World War I, and headed the effort more or less constantly until shortly after the Japanese attack on Pearl Harbor. His identification with the Naval effort was so close that he was the Friedman of the Navy.

== Biography ==
Safford was born in 1893 in Somerville, Massachusetts. He secured an appointment to Annapolis, and graduated fifteenth in the class of 1916. In January 1924 he was called from command of a minesweeper off the China coast to head the "research desk" of the Code and Signal Section within the Office of Naval Communications. In the beginning his sole task was to exploit a Japanese naval codebook that had been filched from the Japanese consulate in New York City. To do this he had four civilian clerical employees.

Safford promoted the effort throughout the Navy, attracting Agnes Meyer Driscoll, Joseph Rochefort, Joseph Wenger, and others who were to lead the business through World War II and into the postwar period. He was the first to begin organizing the worldwide Naval collection and direction finding effort, so that when the United States entered World War II it already had a system of intercept stations. Safford himself was wrenched out of the job in 1926, returning in 1929. He remained with the effort except for another sea tour from 1932 to 1936. Meanwhile, the effort that he headed broke Japanese naval codes, and began mechanizing its operations with the addition of IBM equipment. Safford himself was directly involved with building cryptographic machines, and collaborated with the Army's Frank Rowlett in the invention of the Sigaba, a cipher machine not known to be broken by any country during World War II.

Safford promoted collaboration with the Army on several fronts and was mostly responsible for the Navy entry into a joint effort with the Army on the Japanese diplomatic systems. He recognized the signs of war that appeared in the diplomatic traffic, and he tried to get a warning message to Pearl Harbor several days before the attack but Director of Naval Communications Admiral Noyes rebuffed him. Organizationally, he promoted a decentralized system with Naval COMINT sections in Washington, Hawaii, and Manila.

He gave the chief Japanese naval code problem to the organization in Hawaii, and named Joseph Rochefort to head the effort. He also gave Rochefort a blank check to obtain the very best Navy cryptanalysts. That paid off in the spring of 1942, when Rochefort's team, though unable to break JN-25, the main Japanese naval operational code, was able to deduce important information from it, largely through traffic analysis, in time to help win the Battle of Midway. Rochefort's team was also able to trick the Japanese Navy into sending a message that revealed that it was Midway that was the focus of the attack, not the Aleutians, as Washington cryptanalysts maintained.

While many historians have insisted that Rochefort's team failed to crack the JN-25B naval code, the declassified intercepts refute the notion. In August 1970, Safford reaffirmed his views: "By Dec.1/41, we had the code solved to a readable extent."(Wilford, Decoding Pearl Harbor: USN Cryptanalysis and the Challenge of JN-25B in 1941). But this is sharply disputed in Tower of Skulls by Richard B. Frank, citing a report written during the war that says that no messages in JN-25 were read in 1941.

He was promoted to captain shortly after the United States entered the war, on January 1, 1942. Power struggles with the Navy soon led to Safford's ouster in February 1942, with John R. Redman and Joseph Wenger heading sections of OP-20-G. Safford was sidelined for the remainder of the war, as ultimately was Rochefort.

He retired from active duty in 1953 and died in May 1973.

== Amelia Earhart ==
About 1970 he began a lengthy analysis of the 1937 flight across the Pacific on which Amelia Earhart disappeared, and after establishing the intricate radio transmission documentation he concluded "poor planning, worse execution". A book was subsequently published: Earhart's Flight into Yesterday: The Facts Without the Fiction by Laurance F. Safford with Cameron A. Warren & Robert R. Payne (c2003, Paladwr Press, McLean VA USA) ISBN 1-888962-20-8

== Works ==
- Earhart's Flight into Yesterday: The Facts Without the Fiction (Paladwr Press, 2002) ISBN 1-888962-20-8
