= Joseph Wenger =

American rear-admiral (1901–1970)

Joseph N. Wenger
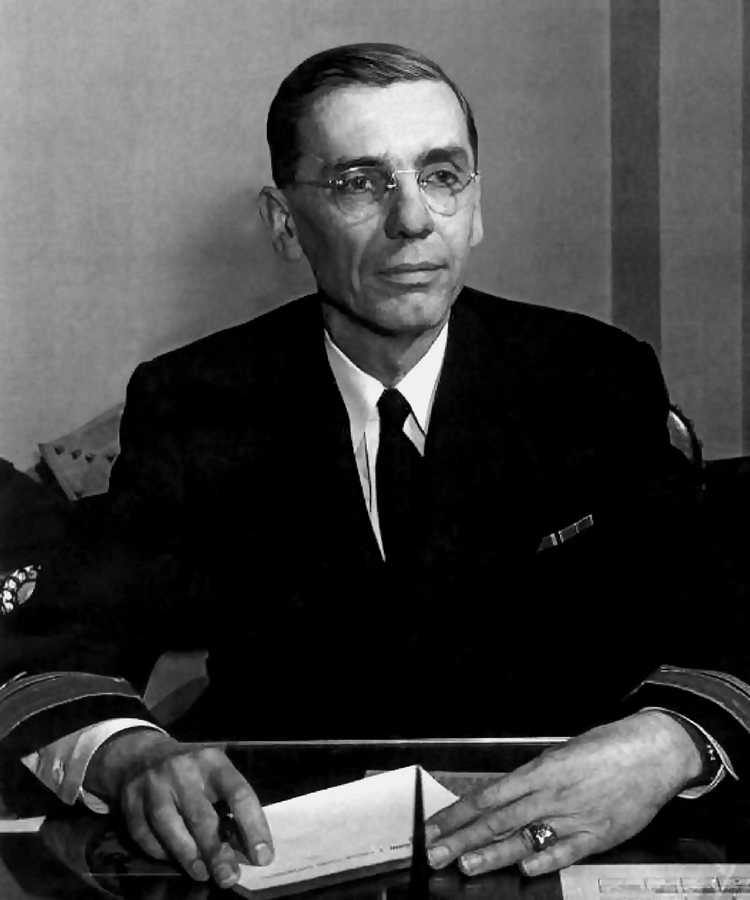

1st Deputy Director of the AFSA, USN
- In office November 1950 – April 1951
- Preceded by: position created
- Succeeded by: Travis Hetherington

1st Vice Director of the NSA
- In office December 1952 – November 1953
- Preceded by: Travis Hetherington
- Succeeded by: John Ackerman

Personal details
- Born: Joseph Numa Wenger; June 7, 1901 Patterson, Louisiana, U.S.
- Died: September 2, 1970 (aged 69) North Conway, N.H., U.S.
- Resting place: Arlington National Cemetery

Military service
- Allegiance: United States
- Branch/service: United States Navy
- Rank: Rear-Admiral

Joseph Numa Wenger (June 7, 1901 – September 2, 1970) was a rear admiral of the United States Navy who served as the first Deputy Director of the Armed Forces Security Agency (AFSA), and later as the first Vice Director of the National Security Agency, from December 1952 to November 1953, after the separate divisions of the AFSA merged into the NSA. Wenger was one of the leaders responsible for the development of the NSA. He was a native of Patterson, Louisiana.

== Work ==
Wenger was "one of the architects of centralized cryptology." In February 1942 Navy power struggles led to the ousting of Laurance Safford from OP-20-G; with two new sections to be headed by Wenger (Communications: Decryption and Translation) and John R. Redman (Communications: Combat Intelligence). Safford was removed from current intelligence to a support and research role. Safford was sidelined for the remainder of the war, as ultimately was Joseph Rochefort.

Wenger was integral in starting the AFSA (Armed Forces Security Agency), the predecessor to the NSA. During World War II he suggested that the Navy spend $2 million "to build 360 of its own four wheel bombes" to break the effective British monopoly on the Bombe.

He retired in 1958, but remained involved in the cryptographic community, including the NSA and private corporations, until his sudden death in 1970.

== See also ==
- Laurance Safford

Preceded by position created	Deputy Director of the Armed Forces Security Agency, USN; 1950–1951	Succeeded by Travis Hetherington

Preceded by Travis Hetherington	Vice Director of the National Security Agency; 1952–1953	Succeeded by John Ackerman
