= Rufus S. Bratton =

American intelligence officer

Rufus Sumter Bratton
- Born: September 5, 1892; York, South Carolina
- Died: March 19, 1958 (aged 65) Honolulu, Hawaii
- Allegiance: United States of America
- Branch: United States Army
- Service years: 1914—1952
- Rank: Colonel
- Conflicts: World War I World War II
- Awards: Legion of Merit (2); Bronze Star Medal

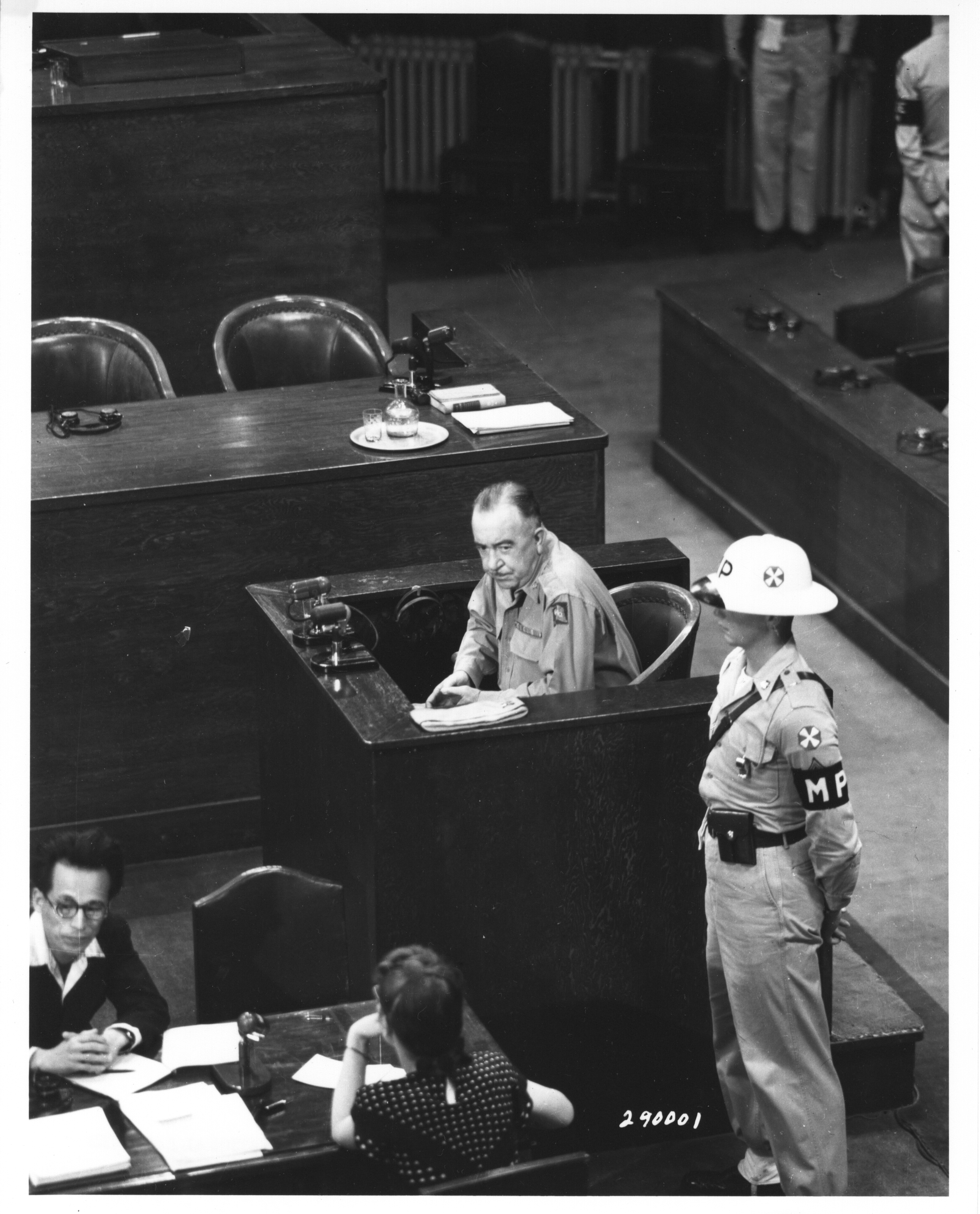
Bratton appears as a witness at the International Military Tribunal for the Far East

Colonel Rufus Sumter Bratton (September 5, 1892 – March 19, 1958) was Chief of the Far Eastern Section of the Intelligence Branch of the Military Intelligence Division (G-2) in the War Department in December 1941, when the United States entered World War II.

== Career prior to December 1941 ==
Bratton graduated West Point in 1914 and was posted to Oahu as a lieutenant in the 1st Infantry Regiment, where he served until the regiment returned to the continental U.S. in 1917. In 1919, Bratton returned to West Point as an instructor until reassigned to Fort Benning to teach infantrymen, Bratton himself being a member of the Infantry Branch.

From 1922 to 1924 Bratton learned Japanese as a student officer in Japan, followed by an appointment to be an assistant military attaché in Tokyo. In 1926 Bratton became a battalion commander of the 45th Regiment of the Philippine Scouts, then returning to America to attend the General Staff School at Fort Leavenworth in 1929. Upon completion of this course in 1931 he returned to Japan and attended the Japanese Imperial War College. The next year he became military attaché at the American Embassy.

Bratton returned from Japan for another battalion command appointment in 1934, taking up his new post early the following year. His new battalion was part of the 7th Infantry and was housed at Vancouver Barracks, Washington. His command ended in late 1936, and he spent the next six months lecturing at the University of Idaho on military science and tactics.

In early 1937 he was appointed to the War Department as a member of the Army General Staff's Military Intelligence Division with responsibility for the Far East and especially Japan. As Chief of the Far Eastern Section, Colonel Bratton was one of the few men, military or civilian, privileged to be given access to the product of American cryptanalysis efforts against Japanese secret codes, known as Magic.

== December 7th ==
Bratton was one of the first officers to receive the intercepted final section of the "14-Part Message" breaking off diplomatic relations early on the morning of December 7. Bratton later recalled treating this intercept as, militarily speaking, unimportant, since it added little to what was already known of Japanese intentions for an attack towards Southeast Asia. Shortly afterwards, however, at close to 9:00 am, a second message was brought to him, revealing the Japanese government expected Ambassador Nomura to deliver the earlier message by no later than 1pm Eastern Standard Time that afternoon. Bratton remembered later that the deadline message "stunned me into frenzied activity because of its implications", which were that the suspected Japanese attack would occur very soon after 1:00 pm local time. Bratton immediately began attempting to contact both his superiors and other members of the General Staff. His first call, very soon after 9:00 am, was to Army Chief of Staff George C. Marshall at Fort Myer, but Marshall was on his customary morning horseback riding excursion, so Bratton left an urgent message with Marshall's orderly and telephoned the Assistant Chief of Staff for Intelligence, Brigadier General Sherman Miles, who hurried to his office, arriving just after 10:00 am.

Soon after Miles arrived, General Marshall called from Fort Myer. Bratton explained the urgent nature of the message, but for security reasons did not explicitly discuss its content. The Colonel offered to drive to Fort Myer with a copy, but Marshall told him he was coming back to his office. Marshall then said he would come to the War Department, but he took 75 minutes to arrive, and did not come to his office until 11:25 am.

At 11:25am Bratton and Miles presented Marshall with both the Fourteen Part Message and the subsequent deadline message. They were soon joined in Marshall's office by Brigadier General Leonard T. Gerow, Chief of the War Plans Division, and Colonel Charles Bundy, Chief of the War Plans Group. Upon reading the dispatch Marshall realized that it "meant Japanese hostile action against some American installation in the Pacific at or shortly after 1 o'clock that afternoon" (494), and decided that all Army Pacific Commands including Hawaii should be alerted, although the Philippines and Thailand were thought to be more likely targets. Colonel Bratton took Marshall's warning message, encoded it, and delivered it to the War Department Message Center. While the Philippines and the Panama Canal Zone received the warning by radio, poor atmospheric conditions were blocking radio communications with Hawaii and the warning was sent as a (non-urgent) telegram. However, when the warning message was finally delivered in Hawaii, the attack was already underway.

== Third Army ==
Bratton remained with the Intelligence Division until assigned to George S. Patton's Third Army as Headquarters Commandant, a role he undertook all throughout the subsequent liberation of Europe.

His actual role, however, was much larger. He functioned as Patton's conduit for Ultra intelligence, often briefing Patton privately in the evenings on what had been discovered that day. Patton tried several times to get Bratton promoted to brigadier general, but without success. Ongoing questions about Bratton's role at Pearl Harbor were thought by many to be the reason behind the denial.

== Fictional representation ==
In the 1970 movie Tora! Tora! Tora! he was played by E.G. Marshall. The film shows him being summoned by Naval Intelligence Lieutenant Commander Alwin Kramer, (played by Wesley Addy). We see Bratton reading a Japanese transcription, nicknamed "Magic", as it comes out of the decryption machine, codenamed "Purple". Later on in the film, because of the incoming messages, Bratton becomes convinced that the Japanese are about to attack Pearl Harbor, though he is incorrect about exactly when the attack will occur – thinking it will come on the Sunday before December 7. The film shows Bratton and Kramer's futile efforts to alert higher-ups that an attack is imminent on the night of December 6 and the morning of the 7th.
