= Edwin T. Layton =

US Navy intelligence officer (1903–1984)

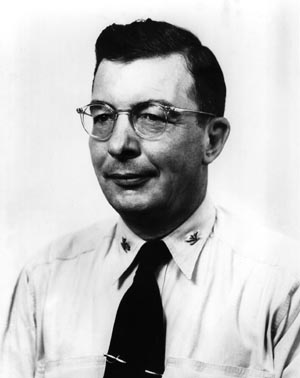
- Born: April 7, 1903; Nauvoo, Illinois, U.S.
- Died: April 12, 1984 (aged 81); Carmel, California, U.S.
- Children: Edwin T. Layton, Jr.
- Military career
- Allegiance: United States
- Branch: United States Navy
- Service years: 1924–1959
- Rank: Rear Admiral
- Commands: USS Boggs
- Conflicts: World War II; Korean War
- Awards: Navy Distinguished Service Medal; Navy Commendation Medal

Edwin Thomas Layton (April 7, 1903 – April 12, 1984) was a rear admiral in the United States Navy. Layton is most noted for his work as an intelligence officer before and during World War II. He was the father of the historian Edwin T. Layton, Jr.

== Early life ==
Edwin Thomas Layton was born on April 7, 1903, in Nauvoo, Illinois, as a son of George E. Layton and his wife Mary C. Layton. Layton attended the United States Naval Academy at Annapolis, Maryland, and graduated in 1924. Layton spent the next five years with the Pacific Fleet aboard the battleship USS West Virginia and destroyer USS Chase.

== Naval career ==
=== Early career ===
In 1929, Layton was one of a small number of naval officers selected to go to Japan for language training.

Layton was assigned to the American Embassy in Tokyo as a naval attaché, where he remained for three years. While in Japan, he met Admiral Isoroku Yamamoto on several occasions. The last four months he spent in Beijing as assistant naval attaché at the American Legation. His linguistic ability and fluency in Japanese would prove to be assets as his career progressed, especially as World War II began in Europe.

During the 1930s, Layton served two tours of duty in the Navy Department's Office of Naval Intelligence, in 1933 and again from 1936 to 1937, but he also saw sea duty. He had a three-year stint on the battleship Pennsylvania, where he received commendations for gunnery excellence. In 1937, he returned to Tokyo for two years as assistant naval attaché at the American Embassy. This was followed by a one-year tour as commanding officer of USS Boggs.

On his first voyage to Japan he had met another young naval officer, Joseph J. Rochefort, assigned to the same duty. Both became intelligence officers, Rochefort specializing in decryption efforts, Layton in using intelligence information in war planning.

One year to the day before the attack on Pearl Harbor, Layton became combat intelligence officer on the staff of Admiral Husband E. Kimmel, Commander-in-Chief of the United States Pacific Fleet, which had recently been moved from its base in San Diego, California, to Pearl Harbor — over the objections of Admiral James O. Richardson, whom Kimmel replaced. Layton was in charge of all intelligence in the Pacific Ocean area.

Layton and Rochefort, who was also stationed at Pearl Harbor, worked closely together, trying to work out aspects of the larger international context of events. They worked even more closely after the war began, especially in the month before the Battle of Midway in June 1942. They both made contributions to that victory.

=== World War II ===
Layton was a champion of using code-breaking information in war planning operations and had strong supporters in both Admiral Kimmel and Admiral Nimitz.

Layton's book And I Was There: Pearl Harbor and Midway — Breaking the Secrets describes how Kimmel and his army counterpart at Pearl Harbor, General Walter C. Short, the commanders there, were scapegoats for failures by higher-ups in Washington, D.C. Layton blamed Admiral Richmond K. Turner in particular for monopolizing naval intelligence in Washington that would have alerted Kimmel and his staff to the imminence of attack and to the fact that Pearl Harbor could be a target of that attack.

Layton's argument is detailed and comprehensive, but in general, he maintains that although Washington was reading the highest level Japanese diplomatic code, Purple, little of this was ever made available to the field commanders, other than to General Douglas MacArthur in the Philippines, who failed to act, not only on the Purple data, but even after he knew that Pearl Harbor had been attacked. The diplomatic information that they were denied not only contained data about the imminence of war, but also included messages sent from Honolulu to Tokyo by Takeo Yoshikawa, the spy sent to observe and report daily on the exact positions of ships in the harbor, using a grid system that was obviously designed for the purpose of targeting torpedoes and bombs. Those above Turner, including his boss, the Chief of Naval Operations, Admiral Harold Rainsford Stark, and even General George Marshall, also come in for blame, though some details are still missing from the official record.

Forrest Biard, another naval linguist, one who was in the last group to be sent to Japan for language studies, worked for the Rochefort HYPO team as soon as he left Japan in 1941. HYPO was located in a basement, called "The Dungeon" by team members. In a speech to the National Cryptologic Museum Foundation, Biard describes Layton as the sixth member of the five-member team (Joseph J. Rochefort, Joe Finnegan, Alva B. Lasswell, Wesley A. Wright, Thomas Dyer) who produced the information that was vital to winning the Battle of Midway, following the Battle of the Coral Sea. He gives the following description of Layton:

Then there was a person — a very special person — who did not serve in the Dungeon with us but who deserves a very high ranking place in the list of five expanded to make it six. He, luckily, worked above ground in fresh Hawaiian air. He was another human dynamo, sharp, quick thinking, fast acting, intuitive, fast to comprehend, and extremely aggressive. In prior assignments he had been a Tokyo Japanese language student and later a code breaker. And, on December 31, he moved from Admiral Kimmel's staff to continue on as Admiral Nimitz's young intelligence officer. He was (Lieutenant) Commander Edwin T. Layton, Naval Academy Class of 1924. Layton and I found many intelligence interests in common having almost nothing to do with Dungeon work, so I came to know him very well and to appreciate fully his tremendous contributions to our results. Joe Rochefort and Eddie Layton were close friends of long standing. They had studied the Japanese language together in Tokyo from 1929 to 1932. Here at Pearl Harbor they worked together in complete harmony, forming an almost perfect team. Rochefort gave Layton remarkably clear and reliable estimates and analyses. The quick-witted Layton might then add comments and suggestions or more analysis. After that he had to sell the final product to Admiral Nimitz. Thank Heavens a very hard-pressed Admiral Nimitz quickly learned to trust the Rochefort/Layton duo that brought him this very restricted, highly secret information which some others on his staff at first were prone to put down as guesswork — even as dangerous guesswork.

During May 1942, in particular, Layton and the Rochefort team were battling Washington as much as the Japanese – both as to where the next attack would occur and when it would occur. Washington said Port Moresby or the Aleutians in mid-June; Rochefort/Layton said Midway, first week in June. The story of how Rochefort's team prevailed is told in the Rochefort article, and in much greater detail in Layton's book. Nimitz deserves the highest praise for realizing that their analysis was sounder, something for which Layton deserves a very great deal of credit, and for risking the wrath of his boss in Washington, Admiral King, something for which Nimitz alone deserves a very great deal of credit. (Selecting Admiral Raymond Spruance to replace the hospitalized Admiral William F. Halsey, Jr. was also the right move, as was the earlier decision to retain Kimmel's intelligence officers.)

Layton remained on the staff of the Pacific Fleet until February 1945, followed by a three-year tour of duty as Commander of the U.S. Naval Net Depot at Tiburon, California. During this time, Admiral Chester W. Nimitz, as a mark of his recognition of Layton's contributions, invited him to Tokyo Bay when the Japanese formally surrendered on September 2, 1945.

Intelligence work occupied Layton again, in the form of a two-year assignment as the first Director of the Naval Intelligence School in Washington D.C.

=== Korean War ===
Starting in 1950, Layton spent six months as intelligence officer on the staff of the commandant, Fourteenth Naval District in Hawaii. His evaluative skills and keen interpretation of events were vital during the early stages of the conflict. In 1951, for a two-year period, he assumed his old position of fleet intelligence officer on the staff of the commander-in-chief, Pacific Fleet.

In 1953, with the war over, Layton was assigned to the staff of the Joint Chiefs where he was assistant director for intelligence, then deputy director. His last duty before retirement was director of the Naval Intelligence School at the Naval Receiving Station, Washington, D.C.

== Later life and death ==
Layton retired in 1959. He went to work for the Northrop Corporation as director of Far East operations in Tokyo, Japan, 1959 to 1963. He retired from Northrop in 1964 and moved to Carmel, California. Not until the 1980s were many of the documents about Pearl Harbor and Midway declassified. His book, And I Was There: Pearl Harbor and Midway — Breaking the Secrets, was written with co-authors Roger Pineau and John Costello and was published in 1985, the year after Layton died. As appears in the books' acknowledgments, his third wife, Miriam (1908–2008), assisted the publication of the book by not only encouraging the admiral to bring his story to print, but also by giving his collaborators access to his research notes and papers after his death.

== In film and fiction ==
Layton's deeds inspired the character of "Matthew Garth", played by Charlton Heston in the 1976 movie Midway; Garth's vital role in translating raw decrypted radio intercepts into meaningful intelligence clearly reflects Layton's contribution. In the film Midway, Layton was played by Patrick Wilson.

== Decorations and honors ==
Here is the ribbon bar of Rear Admiral Edwin T. Layton:

1st Row	Navy Distinguished Service Medal	Navy Commendation Medal	Legion of Merit
2nd Row	Navy Unit Commendation	American Defense Service Medal	American Campaign Medal
3rd Row	Asiatic-Pacific Campaign Medal with four service stars	World War II Victory Medal	Navy Occupation Service Medal
4th Row	National Defense Service Medal	Korean Service Medal with three Service stars	United Nations Korea Medal

The Naval War College in Newport, Rhode Island, honored Layton in the 1960s by naming the Chair of Naval Intelligence after him. The Navy/Marine Corps Intelligence Training Center in Dam Neck VA is named Layton Hall.

== Works ==
- Edwin T. Layton, Roger Pineau, and John Costello (1985), And I Was There: Pearl Harbor and Midway—Breaking the Secrets, New York: William Morrow.
