= Joseph Rochefort =

American naval officer and cryptanalyst (1900–1976)

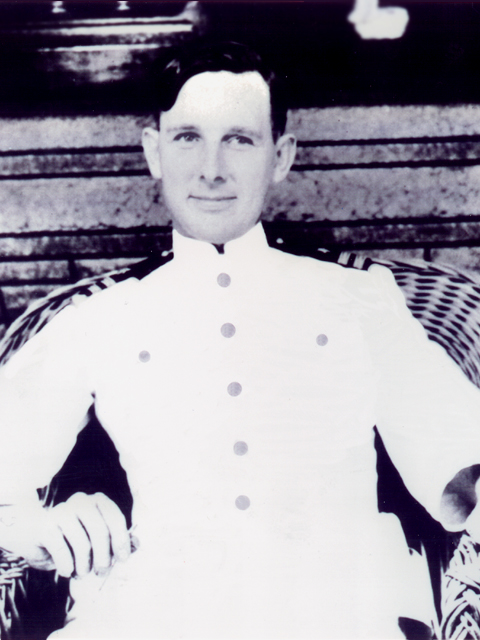
- Born: May 12, 1900; Dayton, Ohio, U.S.
- Died: July 20, 1976 (aged 76); Torrance, California, U.S.
- Burial place: Inglewood Park Cemetery
- Military career
- Allegiance: United States
- Branch: United States Navy
- Service years: 1918–1947; 1950–1953
- Rank: Captain
- Commands: Station Hypo; USS ABSD-2
- Conflicts: World War II; Korean War
- Awards: Navy Distinguished Service Medal; Legion of Merit

Joseph John Rochefort (May 12, 1900 – July 20, 1976) was an American naval officer and cryptanalyst. He was a major figure in the United States Navy's cryptographic and intelligence operations from 1925 to 1946, particularly in the Battle of Midway. His contributions and those of his team were pivotal to victory in the Pacific War.

== Early career ==
Rochefort was born May 12, 1900, in Dayton, Ohio. In 1917, he joined the United States Navy while still in high school in Los Angeles, without obtaining a diploma. When enlisting he gave his birth date as 1898; this adjustment lasted his entire career. He was commissioned as an Ensign after a 14 June 1919 graduation from the US Navy's Steam Engineering School at Stevens Institute of Technology, and later in 1919, became engineering officer of the tanker USS Cuyama.

A fellow officer observed that Rochefort had a penchant for solving crossword puzzles and adept skills at playing the advanced card game auction bridge and recommended him for a Navy cryptanalysis class in Washington, D.C.

Until 1941, Rochefort split his time between sea duty and cryptologic or intelligence-related assignments.

Rochefort's tours ashore included cryptanalytic training as an assistant to Captain Laurance Safford, and work with the master codebreaker Agnes Meyer Driscoll in 1924. He then served a stint as second chief of the Division of Naval Communications' newly created cryptanalytic organization, OP-20-G, from 1926 to 1929.

The US Navy sent him to Japan for training in the Japanese language from 1929 to 1932. He had a two-year intelligence assignment in the Eleventh Naval District, San Diego, from 1936 to 1938.

== World War II ==
=== Pearl Harbor ===
By 1941 Rochefort was both an expert Japanese linguist and trained cryptanalyst. Early that year Laurance Safford, again chief of OP-20-G in Washington, sent him to Pearl Harbor on the island of Oahu, Territory of Hawaii, to become officer in charge of Station Hypo ("H" for Hawaii in the Navy's phonetic alphabet at the time).

Rochefort handpicked many of HYPO's staff, and by the time of the attack on Pearl Harbor had obtained many of the Navy's best cryptanalysts, traffic analysts, and linguists, including Joseph Finnegan. Rochefort's team was assigned to break the Japanese Navy's most secure cypher system, the Flag Officers Code, while Navy cryptographers at Station CAST (Cavite in the Philippines) and OP-20-G in Washington (NEGAT, "N" for Navy Department) concentrated on the main fleet cipher, JN-25.

Rochefort had a close working relationship with Edwin T. Layton Sr., whom he first met on the voyage to Tokyo where both men were sent to learn Japanese at the Navy's request. In 1941, Layton was the chief intelligence officer for Admiral Husband E. Kimmel, Commander in Chief, Pacific Fleet (CINCPAC). Both he and Rochefort were denied access to decrypts of diplomatic messages sent in Purple, the highest level diplomatic cypher used by the Japanese Foreign Office, in the months before the Japanese attack, on the orders of the director of the War Plans Division, Richmond K. Turner.

=== Battle of Midway ===
After the Japanese attack on Pearl Harbor, Navy cryptographers, with assistance from both British cryptographers at the Far East Combined Bureau (in Singapore; later Colombo, Kenya, Colombo), and Dutch cryptographers (in the Dutch East Indies), combined to break enough JN-25 traffic to provide useful intelligence reports and assessments regarding Japanese force disposition and intentions in early 1942. Rochefort would often go for days without emerging from his bunker, where he and his staff spent 12 hours a day, or even longer, working to decode Japanese radio traffic. He often wore slippers and a bathrobe with his khaki uniform and sometimes went days without bathing.

Station HYPO maintained the coming Japanese attack would be in the Central Pacific, and convinced Admiral Chester W. Nimitz (who replaced Kimmel). OP-20-G (with support from Station CAST) insisted it would be elsewhere in the Pacific, probably the Aleutian Islands, possibly Port Moresby in Papua New Guinea, or even the west coast of the United States. OP-20-G, which had been restructured (Safford having been replaced by Commander John Redman, a communications officer untrained in cryptanalysis) agreed the attack was scheduled for mid-June, not late May or early June, as Rochefort maintained. Redman also said that Rochefort was being "un-cooperative", and should concentrate on additive recovery. Admiral Ernest King, Nimitz's superior in Washington, was persuaded by OP-20-G. Rochefort believed an unknown codegroup, AF, referred to Midway.

One of the Station HYPO staff, Jasper Holmes, had the idea of faking a failure of the water supply on Midway Island. He suggested using an unencrypted emergency warning in the hope of provoking a Japanese response, thus establishing whether Midway was a target. Rochefort took the idea to Layton, who put it to Nimitz. Nimitz approved, and the garrison commander was told by submarine cable to immediately radio in "plain-language" an emergency request for water as an explosion in the water desalination system meant that they had only enough water for two weeks. An apparently "follow-up" report was to be made in one of the strip-cipher code systems that the Japanese were known to have captured on Wake. As the plan was to convince Washington, Rochefort tactfully let Fleet Radio Unit, Melbourne (FRUMEL) notify the main objects of the deception (Washington) of the Japanese message by reporting a message from the AF Air Unit saying that they had only enough water for two weeks: "This will confirm identity of AF". Rochefort then sent a reminder on Friday.

The Japanese took the bait. Within hours they broadcast instructions to load additional water desalination equipment, confirming Rochefort's analysis. Layton notes the instructions also "produced an unexpected bonus". They revealed the assault was to come before mid-June.

In Washington, Admiral Ernest J. King, who disliked Rochefort intensely, still was not convinced, however, as to the date of the attack. The date-time data in Japanese naval messages was "superenciphered," or encrypted even before it was encoded in JN-25. HYPO made their all-out effort to crack this by searching the stacks of printouts and punched cards for five-digit number sequences. After finding low-grade codes, the team set about to unravel the cipher itself. Layton credits Lieutenant Joseph Finnegan for discovering "the method that the Japanese had used to lock up their date-time groups." An intercept of 26 May with orders for two destroyer groups escorting invasion transports was analyzed with this table and "really clinched the pivotal date of the operation" as either 4 or 5 June.

During May 1942, Rochefort and his group decrypted, translated, reviewed, analyzed, and reported as many as 140 messages per day. During the week before Nimitz issued his final orders, "decrypts were being processed at the rate of five hundred to a thousand a day."

=== After Midway ===
When Nimitz recommended Rochefort for a Navy Distinguished Service Medal, the recommendation was rejected by King who unfairly considered Rochefort "one of the most unmilitary-looking officers he had ever encountered." Rochefort also told Nimitz to stop the recommendation since it would only "make trouble". Other sources suggest Rochefort received no official recognition during his lifetime because he was made a scapegoat for the embarrassment of OP-20-G and the cryptanalysis section in Washington, who with their greater resources, theoretically should have known the Japanese intentions before the cryptanalysts in Hawaii. CDR John Redman (whose brother was the influential Rear Admiral Joseph Redman) complained to King about the operation of the Hawaii cryptologic station; as a result, Rochefort was reassigned from cryptanalysis to command the floating dry dock ABSD-2 at San Francisco. Rochefort never served at sea again. The fact that Rochefort received no higher recognition at the time is considered by some to have been an outrage and an example of King’s counterproductive personal vendettas. However, he was decorated with the Legion of Merit at the end of the War over Admiral King’s objection.

== After WWII ==
Rochefort headed the Pacific Strategic Intelligence Group in Washington after the war. He died in 1976 in Torrance, California, aged 76.

== Awards ==
In addition to earning the U.S. Legion of Merit at the end of World War II, Rochefort was posthumously awarded the Navy Distinguished Service Medal in 1986. In 2000, he was inducted into the National Security Agency's Hall of Honor.

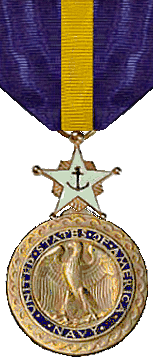
Navy Distinguished Service Medal

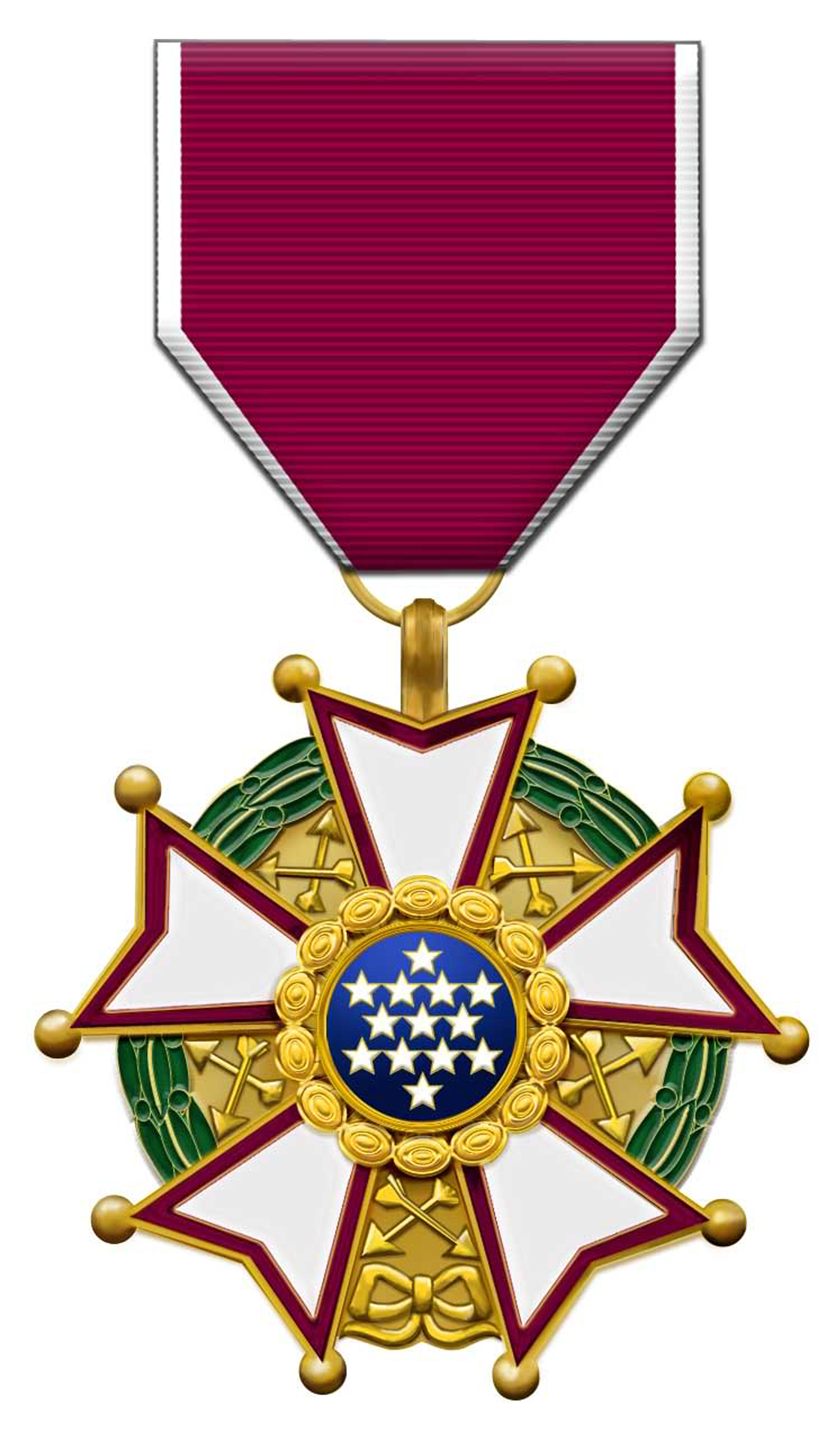
Legion of Merit

== Legacy ==
On 6 January 2012, the CAPT Joseph J. Rochefort Building was dedicated at the NSA facility within a Joint Base Pearl Harbor Hickam Annex, Hawaii.

== Portrayals ==
In the 1976 movie Midway with Charlton Heston and Henry Fonda, Rochefort was portrayed by Hal Holbrook. Rochefort died a month after the movie premiered. In the 2019 film Midway, he was portrayed by actor Brennan Brown.
