= Fleet Radio Unit, Melbourne =

Joint Allied signals intelligence unit of World War II

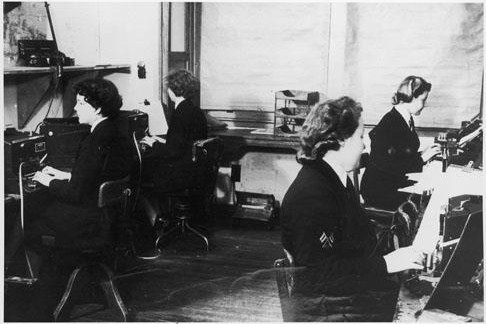
FRUMEL code room

Fleet Radio Unit, Melbourne (FRUMEL) was a United States–Australian–British signals intelligence unit, founded in Melbourne, Australia, during World War II. It was one of two major Allied signals intelligence units called Fleet Radio Units in the Pacific theatre, the other being FRUPAC (also known as Station HYPO), in Hawaii. FRUMEL was a U.S. Navy organization, reporting directly to CINCPAC (Admiral Nimitz) in Hawaii and the Chief of Naval Operations (Admiral King) in Washington, D.C., and hence to the central cryptographic organization. The separate Central Bureau in Melbourne (later Brisbane) was attached and reported to General Douglas MacArthur's Allied South West Pacific Area command headquarters.

== History ==
FRUMEL was established at the Monterey Apartments in Queens Road in early 1942, and was made up of three main groups. First was Lieutenant Rudolph J. (Rudi) Fabian's 75-man codebreaker unit, previously based at the United States Navy's Station CAST in the Philippines before being evacuated by submarine on 8 April 1942. The second was Commander Eric Nave's small Royal Australian Navy-supported cryptography unit, which had moved to the Monterey Apartments from Victoria Barracks in February 1942. Nave's unit was made up of a core of naval personnel, heavily assisted by university academics and graduates specialising in linguistics and mathematics (including from June 1941 a "cipher group" of four from Sydney University). These included Thomas Room, Dale Trendall, Athanasius Treweek, Eric Barnes, Jack Davies and Ronald Bond. The third group was a trio of British Foreign Office linguists (Henry Archer, Arthur Cooper and Hubert Graves), and Royal Navy support staff, evacuated from Singapore, particularly from the Far East Combined Bureau (FECB) there. IBM punched card tabulating machines were obtained in 1942 to replace those left behind in Manila Bay on leaving Corregidor.

Nave and Fabian had a difficult relationship, and Nave was forced out of FRUMEL, going to Central Bureau, the joint Australian-U.S. Army codebreaking unit in Brisbane, where he was welcomed. The 1942 Holden Agreement specifically stated that Nave was not to work at FRUMEL. According to Jenkins, Fabian wasted no time in getting rid of the civilian supernumeraries at Monterey, many of them British service wives who had been evacuated from Singapore. He also squeezed out the Foreign Office types like Cooper and Archer. However, A.B. Jamieson (Nave's second recruit) and Ath Treweek had cordial relations with the Americans and stayed at FRUMEL throughout the war.

Fabian or his deputy John Lietweller were always in the office, 24 hours a day. Fabian was "a highly professional officer with an air of authority and a hint of Central European sophistication", although he was born in Butte, Montana in 1908. However, he "regarded co-operation with anyone who was not in the U.S. Navy or under its command as poor security". One senior British officer said the atmosphere at FRUMEL was, "What is yours is mine, and what is mine is my own", and Fabian (backed by Redman and Herbert Leary) was not interested in any exchange of material with the Central Bureau. Fabian once burnt a document in front of MacArthur's intelligence officer, Major General Charles A. Willoughby, to demonstrate that only MacArthur himself and his chief of staff Richard Sutherland could be present at FRUMEL briefings and that Willoughby was not allowed to see the document (see Central Bureau-FRUMEL relations).

Joan Sanders Majithia is one of the last surviving members of the unit.

== Intercept stations ==
The major (naval) Intercept Stations which carried out intercept and D/F (direction finding) but not cryptographic work were:

- Park Orchards in Melbourne
- HMAS Harman near Canberra
- HMAS Coonawarra near Darwin

== See also ==
- USN Supplementary Radio Station Adelaide River
- Naval Base Melbourne
