= Station HYPO =

United States Navy intelligence unit

Station HYPO, also known as Fleet Radio Unit Pacific (FRUPAC), was the United States Navy signals monitoring and cryptographic intelligence unit in Hawaii during World War II. It was one of two major Allied signals intelligence units, called Fleet Radio Units in the Pacific theaters, along with FRUMEL in Melbourne, Australia. The station took its initial name from the phonetic code at the time for "H" for Heʻeia, Hawaii radio tower. The precise importance and role of HYPO in penetrating the Japanese naval codes has been the subject of considerable controversy, reflecting internal tensions amongst US Navy cryptographic stations.

HYPO was under the control of the OP-20-G Naval Intelligence section in Washington. Before the attack on Pearl Harbor of December 7, 1941, and for some time afterwards, HYPO was in the basement of the Old Administration Building at Pearl Harbor. Later on, a new building was constructed for the station, though it had been reorganized and renamed by then.

== Background ==
Cryptanalytic problems facing the United States in the Pacific prior to World War II were largely those related to Japan. An early decision by OP-20-G in Washington divided responsibilities for them among CAST at Cavite and then Corregidor, in the Philippines, HYPO in Hawaii, and OP-20-G itself in Washington. Other Navy crypto stations, including Guam and Bainbridge Island on Puget Sound were tasked and staffed for signals interception and traffic analysis.

The US Army's Signals Intelligence Service (SIS) broke into the highest level Japanese diplomatic cypher (called PURPLE by the US) well before the attack on Pearl Harbor. PURPLE produced little of military value, as the Japanese Foreign Ministry was thought by the ultra-nationalists to be unreliable. Furthermore, decrypts from PURPLE, eventually called MAGIC, were poorly distributed and used in Washington. SIS was able to build several PURPLE machine equivalents. One was sent to CAST, but as HYPO's assigned responsibility did not include PURPLE traffic, no PURPLE machine was ever sent there. The absence of such a machine on site in Hawaii has long been seen by conspiracy theorists as a reason for US unpreparedness in Hawaii, and/or to be evidence of a conspiracy by high level officials to deprive Pearl Harbor of intelligence known to Washington. However, no hard evidence for any such conspiracy exists.

=== Japanese naval signals in 1941 and early 1942 ===
HYPO was assigned responsibility for work on Japanese Navy systems, and after an agreement with Australia, the United Kingdom and Netherlands to share the effort, worked with crypto groups based at Melbourne, Hong Kong and Batavia. Prior to the attack on Pearl Harbor, the amount of available IJN traffic was low, and little progress had been made on the most important Japanese Navy system, called JN-25 by U.S. analysts. JN-25 was used by the IJN for high level operations: movement and planning commands, for instance. It was a state-of-the-art superencrypted code, eventually a two-book system. Cryptanalytic progress was slow. Most references cite about 10% of messages partially (or sometimes completely) decrypted prior to December 1, 1941, at which time a new version of the system went into effect, requiring the cryptanalysts to start again. Although most references did set the limit of the percent of the messages that were decrypted at 10%, they were not privy to the latest information. Wilford in his Decoding Pearl Harbor: USN Cryptanalysis and the Challenge of JN-25B in 1941, suggests that this view is now untenable and that the JN-25 codes were readable to a great extent and hence, lends "support to the revisionist theories of Toland and Stinnett".

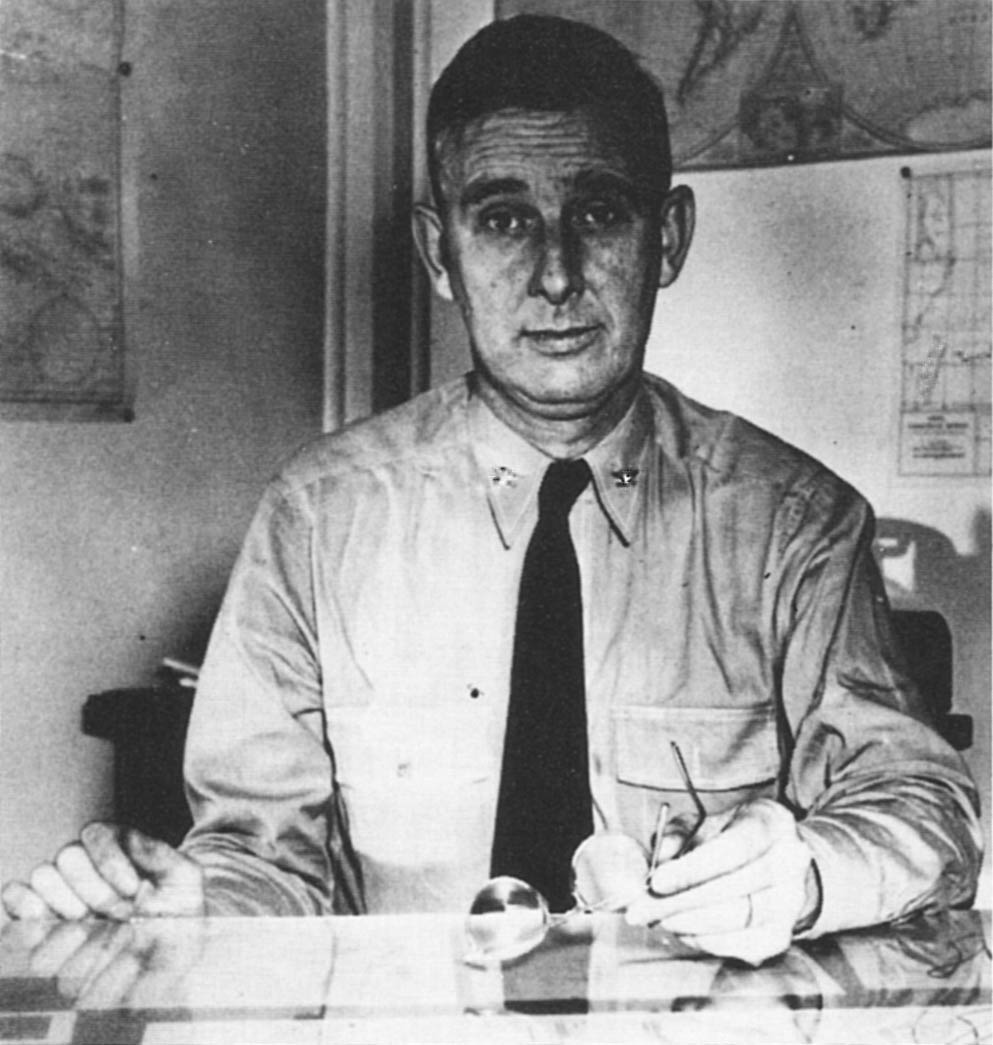
LCDR Joseph J. Rochefort led and handpicked many of the key codebreakers at HYPO.

After the attack on Pearl Harbor, there was considerably more JN-25 traffic as the Japanese Navy operational tempo increased and geographically expanded, which helped progress against it. Hong Kong's contribution stopped until the crypto station there could be relocated (to Ceylon and eventually Kenya), but HYPO and the Dutch at Batavia, in conjunction with CAST and OP-20-G made steady progress. HYPO in particular made significant contributions. Its people, including its commander, Joseph Rochefort, thought a forthcoming Japanese attack early in 1942 was intended for the central Pacific, while opinion at OP-20-G, backed by CAST, favored the North Pacific, perhaps in the Aleutians.

In early 1942, in response to the Japanese advances in the Philippines (which threatened CAST), the possibility of an invasion of Hawaii, and the increasing demand for intelligence, another signals intelligence center, known as NEGAT was formed in Washington, using elements of OP-20-G. In the words of NSA historian Frederick D. Parker:

By the middle of March 1942, two viable naval radio intelligence centers existed in the Pacific—one in Melbourne, Australia [FRUMEL], and one, HYPO, in Pearl Harbor, Hawaii ... The center on Corregidor (CAST) was no longer affiliated with a fleet command, and its collection and processing capabilities were rapidly disintegrating as a result of evacuations of personnel to Australia and destruction of its facilities by bombing and gunfire.

Japanese traffic was intercepted regarding a new offensive operation being planned against a target only identified as AF. LCDR Wilfred J. Holmes at HYPO was responsible for the ruse which identified AF: a false report of a fresh water shortage on Midway was radioed in clear, evoking an encrypted Japanese response noting that AF was reporting water troubles; AF had to be Midway.

As mid-1942 approached, HYPO was under high pressure, and there are tales of 36-hour stints, of Rochefort working in his bathrobe and appearing for briefings late and disheveled besides. This effort climaxed in the last week of May with the decryption of enough JN-25 traffic to understand the Japanese attack plan at Midway in some, but not complete detail. This allowed Admiral Nimitz to gamble on the ambush that resulted in the Battle of Midway, the loss of four Japanese carriers and many naval aviators for much lower Allied losses, and what is generally agreed to have been the turning point of the Pacific War.

== Post-Midway transfers and changes ==
In October 1942, after Midway, power struggles within the Navy resulted in the sidelining of Laurance Safford, with the support of Admirals Ernest King and Richmond K. Turner (and Joseph Redman). Control of naval intercept and codebreaking was centralizing in OP-20-G in Washington, where two new sections were headed by John R. Redman (Communications Combat Intelligence section) and Joseph Wenger (Communications Cryptanalytical section; to handle decryption and translation). Safford was shifted to an administrative support and cryptographic research role; so was sidelined for the remainder of the war (doing no further crypto work); as was Joseph Rochefort in Hawaii (he was assigned to command a dry-dock on the West Coast).

After Midway, Rochefort was recommended for the Distinguished Service Medal to Admiral Ernest King. However, personal enmity from his chief of staff due to a prior passing encounter, and non-support from his immediate supervisors, led King to deny the award. Nimitz, when he learned of Rochefort's treatment some years later, was quite displeased. Rochefort was posthumously awarded the medal after a campaign by his intelligence officers galvanized Admiral D. "Mac" Showers and eventually CIA head William Casey to rectify the oversight.

Having commandeered a girls' school in Washington (the Army took over one too), Naval Intelligence and OP-20-G expanded greatly. HYPO became a smaller proportion of the total Navy signals intelligence effort in the Pacific.
