= Station CAST =

Station CAST was the United States Navy signals monitoring and cryptographic intelligence fleet radio unit at Cavite Navy Yard in the Philippines, until Cavite was captured by the Japanese forces in 1942, during World War II. It was an important part of the Allied intelligence effort, addressing Japanese communications as the War expanded from China into the rest of the Pacific theaters. As Japanese advances in the Philippines threatened CAST, its staff and services were progressively transferred to Corregidor in Manila Bay, and eventually to a newly formed US-Australian station, FRUMEL in Melbourne, Australia.

STATION CAST had originally been located at Shanghai but had been evacuated to Cavite in early 1941 as part of the US Navy's disengagement with China.

Prior to the war, CAST was the US Navy's Far East cryptographic operation, under the OP-20-G Naval Intelligence section in Washington. It was located at the Navy Yard in Manila and moved into the tunnels on Corregidor, as Japanese attacks increased. STATION CAST possessed one of the PURPLE machines produced by the US Army.

Cryptanalytic problems facing the United States in the Pacific prior to World War II were largely Japanese. An early decision by OP-20-G divided responsibility for Japanese cryptanalysis amongst its various stations. Station CAST (at Manila in the Philippines), Station HYPO (Pearl Harbor, Hawaii) OP-20-02, and OP-20-G itself in Washington, shared cryptanalytic duties. Other Stations (on Guam, in Puget Sound on Bainbridge Island, etc.) were tasked and staffed for signals interception and traffic analysis.

== PURPLE diplomatic traffic ==
The US Army Signal Intelligence Service (SIS) break into the highest security Japanese diplomatic cypher (called PURPLE by US analysts) produced very interesting intelligence, but little of military value (except for Ambassador Hiroshi Oshima's despatches from Germany); none of tactical value, and not much more of direct political value as the Foreign Office in Japan was thought by the ultra-nationalists in effective charge of Japanese foreign and military policy, to be unreliable. Furthermore, decrypts from PURPLE traffic, eventually called MAGIC, were rather capriciously distributed to high level officials in Washington, and in general, poorly used. SIS was able to build several PURPLE machine equivalents and the distribution of those machines has since been thought controversial. One was sent to Station CAST. After the US entered the War, two went to Bletchley Park, the center of British cryptographic work. One was sent to the Far East Combined Bureau (FECB) at Singapore, and was lost during the fall of Singapore

== Japanese Navy crypto systems: JN-25 ==
Stations HYPO and CAST were assigned responsibility for work on Japanese Navy systems, and after the agreement with the United Kingdom and Netherlands to share the effort, worked with crypto groups in Hong Kong then Singapore (Far East Combined Bureau) and Batavia (Kamer 14 or Room 14).

Prior to the attack on Pearl Harbor, the amount of available traffic was low, and little progress had been made on the most important Japanese Navy system, called by US analysts JN-25. JN-25 was used for high level operations: movement and planning commands, for instance. It was a superencrypted code, eventually a two-book system, and joint cryptanalytic progress was slow. JN-25B was introduced on 1 December 1940, but was broken immediately by FECB as the additives were not changed. Most references cite about 10% of messages partially (or sometimes completely) decrypted prior to 1 December 1941, at which time a new edition of the system went into effect and sent all the cryptanalysts back to the beginning.

After 7 December 1941, there was considerably more JN-25 traffic as the Japanese Navy operational tempo increased and geographically expanded, and progress against it went better. The FECB contribution stopped until the crypto station could be relocated from Singapore to Ceylon, but CAST, HYPO, and the Dutch at Batavia, in conjunction with OP-20-G, made steady progress.

== CAST during and after the invasion of the Philippines ==
Station CAST and its personnel and equipment were moved from Manila to the tunnels on Corregidor as the Japanese approached and spent the next months working there. Eventually, they destroyed their equipment (some IBM punched card machines are said to have been among the gear shoved into the harbor) and were evacuated in stages by submarines USS Seadragon and USS Permit to Australia, for service with FRUMEL. Some personnel also worked at the Central Bureau, supplying signals intelligence to MacArthur's South West Pacific Area (command).
