= Marci =

Marci may refer to:

- 3791 Marci, a main belt asteroid named after Jan Marek Marci
- Marci (crater), a lunar crater named after Jan Marek Marci
- Marci Beaucoup, a studio album by American hip hop artist Roc Marciano
- Mars Color Imager (MARCI), camera built for Mars Reconnaissance Orbiter

== Biology ==
- Odetta marci, a species of sea snail
- Felimare marci, a species of sea slug
- Bibio marci, a fly from the family Bibionidae
- Neptis marci, a butterfly in the family Nymphalidae
- Aphnaeus marci, a butterfly in the family Lycaenidae
- Cephetola marci, a butterfly in the family Lycaenidae

== Movies ==
- Marci és a kapitány, a Hungarian series of puppet films from 1977
- Marci X, a 2003 American romcom movie

== People ==
- Marci Bowers (born 1958), an American gynecologist
- Marci Francisco (born 1950), a U.S. Democratic member of the Kansas Senate
- Marci Geller, an American singer-songwriter
- Marci Gonzalez (born 1982), a reporter for ABC News
- Marci Hamilton (born 1957), head of an American think tank to prevent child abuse and neglect
- Marci Harris, CEO and co-founder of PopVox
- Marci Ien (born 1969), a Canadian broadcast journalist
- Marci Jobson (born 1975), an American soccer player
- Marci Klein (born 1967), an American television producer
- Marci Liroff (born 1958), an American casting director
- Carl Marci (born 1969), an American neuroscientist
- Jan Marek Marci (1595–1667), a Czech doctor and scientist
- Marci McDonald, a Canadian journalist and author
- Marci Miller (born 1989), an American model, singer and actress
- Marci Shore, an American associate professor of intellectual history at Yale University
- Marci Zaroff, an American green business leader

== See also ==
- Marcis Auto Racing
- Mārcis Auziņš
- Dave Marcis
- Mārcis Ošs
