= Leonell C. Strong =

American scientist (1894–1982)

Leonell C. Strong (19 January 1894 – 31 August 1982) was a cancer research scientist and amateur cryptographer.

In 1947 he published a translation of two pages of the Voynich Manuscript in which he claimed that the author was Anthony Askham (who, in fact lived about a century after the VM has since been proved to have been created).

In 1978 he received the William B. Coley Award.
