= Ascham =

Ascham may refer to:

- Ascham School

== People ==
- Anthony Ascham (c. 1614 – 1650), British academic, political theorist, Parliamentarian and diplomat
- Anthony Ascham (astrologer)
- Roger Ascham
