= Raphael Sobiehrd-Mnishovsky =

Bohemian lawyer and writer (1580–1644)

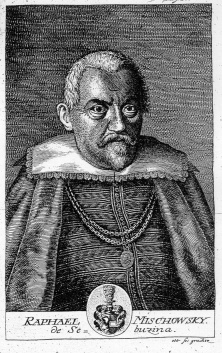
Sobiehrd-Mnishovsky

Raphael Sobiehrd-Mnishovsky of Sebuzin and of Horstein (Czech: Rafael Soběhrd Mnišovský; 1580 in Horšovský Týn – 21 November 1644 in Prague) was a Bohemian lawyer and writer. He held various secretarial, diplomatic, and judicial posts under Rudolf II, Mathias, Ferdinand II, and Ferdinand III, under whom Raphael was the attorney-general.

Mnishovsky was also a poet and cryptographer, and is associated with the mystery of the Voynich manuscript. According to a 1666 letter which was stored with the manuscript, Raphael had told the letter's writer, Marcus Marci, that the manuscript had originally belonged to Rudolf, who had purchased it for 600 gold ducats.
