= Prescott Currier =

American cryptanalyst (1912–1995)

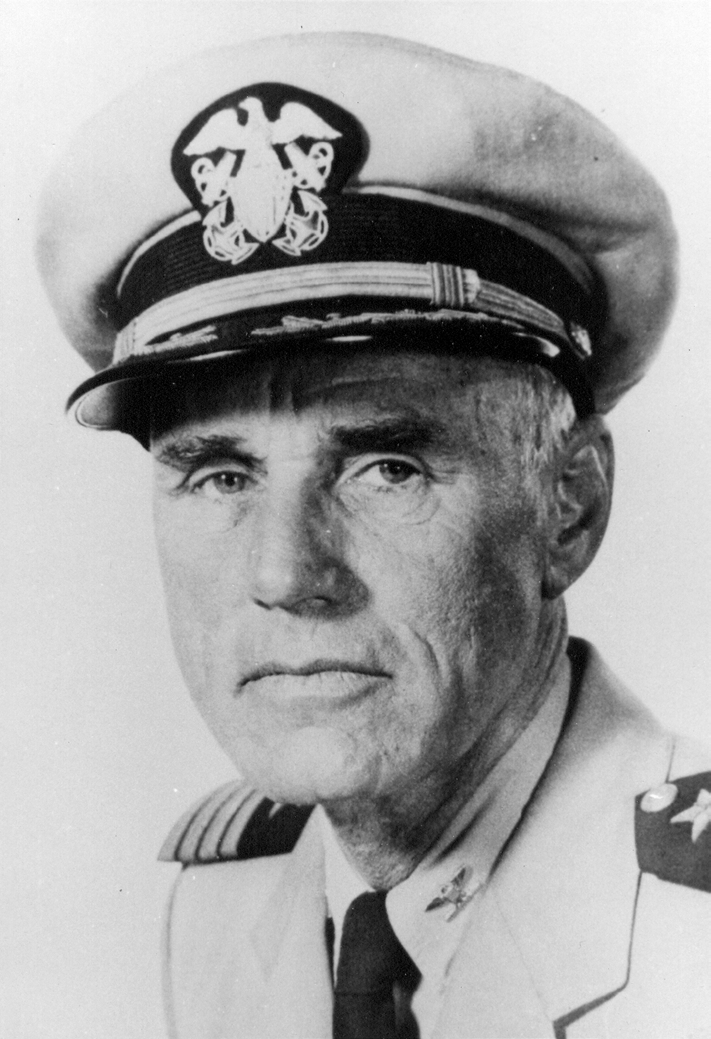
- Born: 4 June 1912; Holbrook, Massachusetts, United States
- Died: 12 January 1995 (aged 82); Damariscotta, Maine, United States
- Military career
- Allegiance: United States
- Branch: United States Navy
- Service years: 1929–1962
- Rank: Captain
- Known for: Cryptography
- Conflicts: World War II; Korean War
- Awards: Legion of Merit (2)

Prescott Hunt Currier (4 June 1912 – 12 January 1995) was an American naval officer and cryptanalyst who contributed to American and British cryptographic cooperation during World War II and later gained recognition for his work on the Voynich manuscript. In 1941, Currier was part of a U.S. cryptologic delegation that visited Bletchley Park, where he contributed to early Anglo-American codebreaking efforts. He was awarded the Legion of Merit twice, in the Second World War and the Korean War respectively. He analyzed the Voynich manuscript in the 1970s, proposing significant structural insights that have influenced subsequent research into the manuscript's origins.

== Early years ==
Prescott Hunt Currier was born in Holbrook, Massachusetts, on 4 June 1912. He attended the Naval Academy Preparatory School for a year, but was not admitted to the United States Naval Academy due to being underweight.

On 8 July 1929, Currier enlisted in the United States Navy. He trained at the Radio School in Washington, D.C., and became one of the first radio intercept operators, known as the "On-the-Roof Gang", graduating with class 8 in 1932. He was assigned to Station Cast, based at Olongapo in the Philippines, an American territory at the time, as a radioman third (and later second) class. Station Cast was engaged in eavesdropping on Japanese radio communications. While there, he taught himself Japanese.

After four years in the Navy, Currier completed his enlisted service obligation and returned to the States, where he began his university studies at Dartmouth College. He later received a letter from Lieutenant Commander Joseph Wenger, inviting him to Washington, D.C., to work for the Navy doing cryptanalysis. He accepted and joined OP-20-G, the Navy's signals intelligence and cryptanalysis group, as a civilian. Currier was commissioned in the United States Navy Reserve as an ensign in April 1936. He was called to active duty in 1940 and promoted to lieutenant in November, working with and for Agnes Driscoll.

== World War II ==
In January 1941, Currier, along with Ensign Robert H. Weeks and Army representatives Captain Abraham Sinkov and First Lieutenant Leo Rosen, traveled to the United Kingdom on the British battleship HMS King George V to deliver American-built cryptographic devices. This included analogs of the Japanese Red and Purple machines; the Americans did not know that the British had also broken Red.

When they reached Scapa Flow, the intention was for them to be flown south in seaplanes, but the crates carrying the machines were too big. They were therefore transferred to the cruiser HMS Neptune, with the crates lashed to the deck. En route, they were strafed by the Luftwaffe, but Currier found that the machines were undamaged. On 8 February, the four became the first Americans to visit Bletchley Park, where the British codebreakers were working on decrypting the German Enigma and other codes.

The delivery of the Purple machine convinced the British to divulge how Enigma was being broken, and the four Americans were shown the inner workings of the bombes. The Americans realised that some people in Washington might be disappointed that the British were not supplying an Enigma machine in exchange, but the team understood that the British had neither machines or bombes to spare, and very little traffic was being intercepted in America. However, they did bring back details of its wiring. In addition, the Americans saw the British high-frequency direction finding (HF/DF) system, which allowed the location of radio broadcasts to be pinpointed, regardless of whether the coded message could be read. This was something Currier and Weeks had been tasked with obtaining information about, and they brought back not just information, but an entire working Marconi-Adcock HF/DF set complete with masts and antennae.

In November 1941, Currier, along with Driscoll and Laurance Safford, went to the Massachusetts Institute of Technology for talks regarding the National Defense Research Committee's project to develop high-speed analytic machinery for codebreaking. OP-20-G's workload increased after the United States officially entered World War II. In March 1942, British Lieutenant Colonel John Tiltman visited the section, and noted that although Currier was a skilled cryptographer, he was the only one in the section who could read Japanese, and therefore was mainly engaged in translation. In the spring of 1942, Currier moved to the section responsible for translation. In February 1943, he became the senior watch officer at the Nebraska Avenue Complex. He was promoted to commander in July 1945. For his service from 7 December 1941 to 2 September 1945, he was awarded the Legion of Merit.

== Naval security and the Korean War ==
After the war ended, Currier attended the Russian Language School in Boulder, Colorado. He then became the US Navy's representative at Britain's Government Communications Headquarters (GCHQ) from 1946 to 1948. Between 1948 and 1950, he was the director of research in the Naval Security Group. He was awarded a Gold Star in lieu of a second award of the Legion of Merit for his service during the Korean War in the Office of Operations, Armed Forces Security Agency, from 15 July 1950 to 1 November 1951. From 1952 to 1954, he commanded the Naval Security Group at Kamiseya in Japan. He was promoted to captain in 1955. That year, he returned to the UK as assistant naval attaché. In 1958, he became the secretary of the Communications Intelligence Board at Fort Meade, Maryland.

Currier retired from the Navy in 1962, with the rank of captain. He went to the UK, where he earned a diploma in comparative philology from the University of London. He then returned to the National Security Agency (NSA) as a civilian. He became a consultant to the NSA in 1965, and remained in this role until he retired.

== Voynich manuscript ==
In the 1970s, Currier attempted to decipher the Voynich manuscript. He was unsuccessful, but his work provided a significant advancement in the research of the manuscript, through his observation that the text had two distinct parts.

== Death and legacy ==
Currier died on 12 January 1995, at his home in Damariscotta, Maine. For his significant contributions to cryptography, the Central Security Service of the National Security Agency referred to Currier as a "giant" in cryptography.
