= Giovanni Fontana (engineer) =

Italian physician and engineer

Giovanni Fontana, also known as Johannes de Fontana (c. 1395 – c. 1455), was a fifteenth-century Italian physician and engineer. He was born in Venice in the 1390s and attended the University of Padua, where he received his degree in arts in 1418 and his degree in medicine in 1421. University records list him as "Master John, son of Michael de la Fontana". His most famous promoter at the university was the scholastic Paul of Venice. He tells us that the Doge of Venice sent him to Brescia to deliver a message to the condottiere Francesco Carmagnola. He was also employed as the municipal physician by the city of Udine.

== Works ==
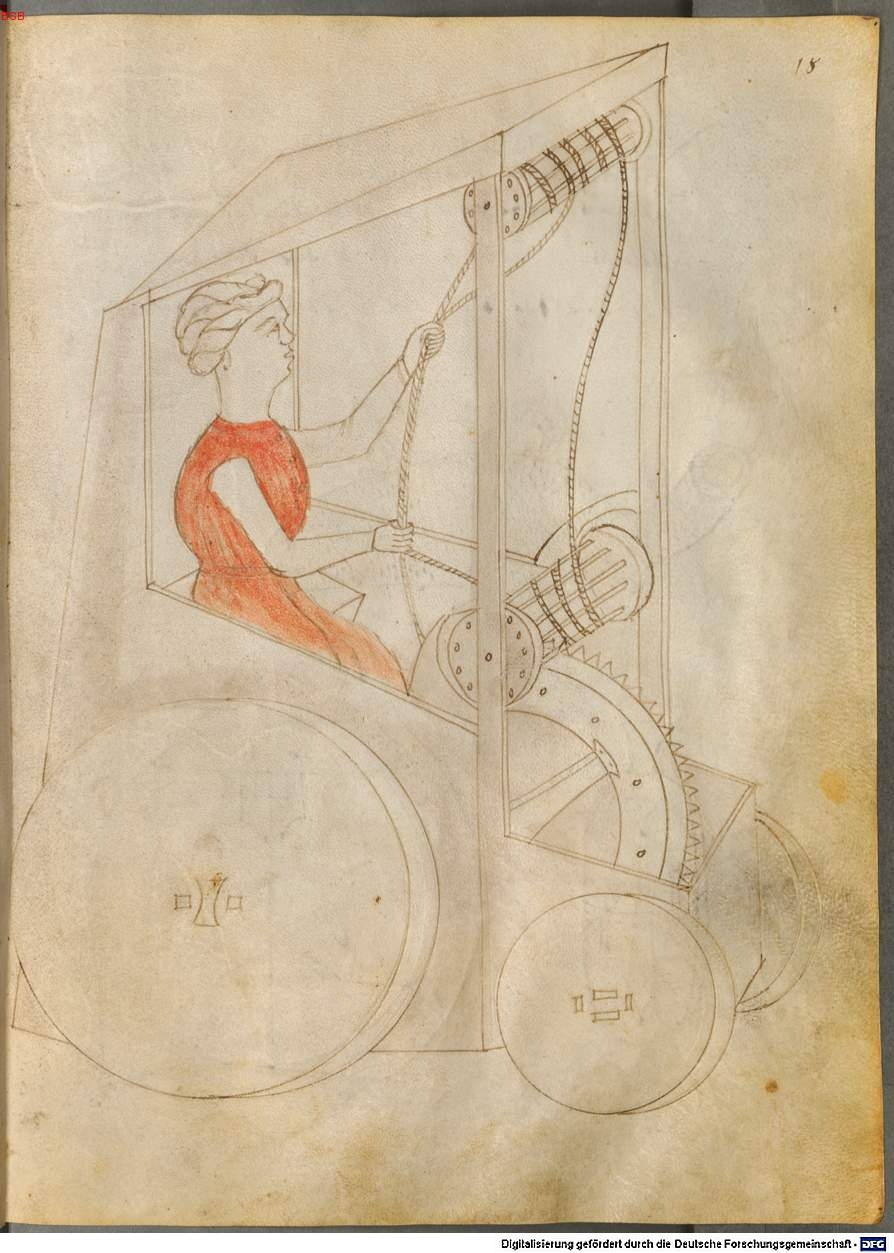
Illustration from Bellicorum instrumentorum liber, Venice c. 1420 - 1430

Fontana composed treatises on a diverse array of topics, including the measurement of heights or depths by falling stones. We have early works of his on water-clocks (with wheels), sand-clocks and measurement. Fontana studied trigonometric measurements, mentioned in De trigono balistario, and through his own designed instrument, also explained in a larger treatise, however, apparently lost. He wrote a treatise on perspective and showed it to the painter Jacopo Bellini. Grafton notes, "Modern scholars often note that early engineers did not supply formal working drawings of their devices, but represented them in real time, functioning, in a way that did not give away their secrets but could appeal to patrons. Fontana, however, makes a superb exception to this rule. ... He drew not only male and female devils inspiring terror in real time by their fearsome appendages, but also the underlying mechanisms, which he laid out with the abstracting brilliance of a fifteenth-century Giacometti or Max Ernst. ... Fontana insisted that he was no magus. When witnesses at Padua exclaimed that a torpedo he had designed must run by diabolical power, he refuted them with contempt: the device was purely mechanical, as befitted a maker who was also a master of both medieval Archimedean statics and optics and of Renaissance engineering craft."

=== Bellicorum instrumentorum liber ===
Fontana composed one of the earliest Renaissance technological treatises, Bellicorum instrumentorum liber. His machine book contains siege engines and fantastic inventions such as a magic lantern and a rocket-propelled bird, fish, and rabbit. Fontana also built a 4-wheeled "bike" with a rope connected by gears.

Sparavigna 2013 notes, "He illustrates the designs of musical instruments such as mechanical organs (Puerilia) and masks, keys and locks, warships, double mirrors, stoves and surgical instruments. The code contains a part dedicated to hydraulic projects, public fountains, systems of water distribution, experiments with siphons, and also alembics and alchemical vessels for two or more liquids. According to [10,6], this manuscript shows that Fontana aimed to investigate a series of devices from ancient books of mathematicians and naturalists such as Archimedes, Heron, Philo, and even Ovid and Pliny the Elder, and the Arab writers, mainly from Al-Kindi, to his contemporary artists and craftsmen."

=== Secretum de thesauro experimentorum ymaginationis hominum ===
In the book Secretum de thesauro experimentorum ymaginationis hominum (Secret of the treasure-room of experiments in man's imagination), written ca. 1430, Fontana described mnemonic machines, written in his cypher. At least Bellicorum instrumentorum liber and this book used a cryptographic system, described as a simple, rational cipher, based on signs without letters or numbers. It has been suggested that some illustrations slightly resemble Voynich illustrations. During this time he also met with the Count of Carmagnola.

== See also ==
- Johannes Trithemius

== Bibliography ==
=== Editions and translations ===
Horst Kranz (Ed.): Johannes Fontana: Opera iuvenalia de rotis horologiis et mensuris. Jugendwerke über Räder, Uhren und Messungen. Franz Steiner, Stuttgart 2011, ISBN 978-3-515-09909-7

Horst Kranz (Ed.): Johannes Fontana: Liber instrumentorum iconographicus. Ein illustriertes Maschinenbuch. Franz Steiner, Stuttgart 2014, ISBN 978-3-515-10660-3

Horst Kranz, Walter Oberschelp (Eds.): Mechanisches Memorieren und Chiffrieren um 1430. Johannes Fontanas Tractatus de instrumentis artis memorie. Franz Steiner, Stuttgart 2009, ISBN 978-3-515-09296-8

Horst Kranz (Ed.): Methoden des Erinnerns und Vergessens. Johannes Fontanas Secretum de thesauro experimentorum ymaginationis hominum. Franz Steiner, Stuttgart 2016, ISBN 978-3-515-11583-4

Johannes Fontana: De trigono balistario - Das Ballistendreieck. Technische Kapitel und ausgewählte Anwendungen. Texterstellung, Übersetzung und Zeichnungen von Horst Kranz. s. l. 2021, https://doi.org/10.5281/zenodo.4481359
