= Marci McDonald =

Marci McDonald is a Canadian journalist and author of The Armageddon Factor: The Rise of Christian Nationalism in Canada and Yankee Doodle Dandy: Brian Mulroney and the America Agenda.

She has won eight gold National Magazine Awards, Canadian Association of Journalists' investigative feature award, and the Atkinson Fellowship in Public Policy.
