= Jan Marek Marci =

Czech medical doctor and scientist

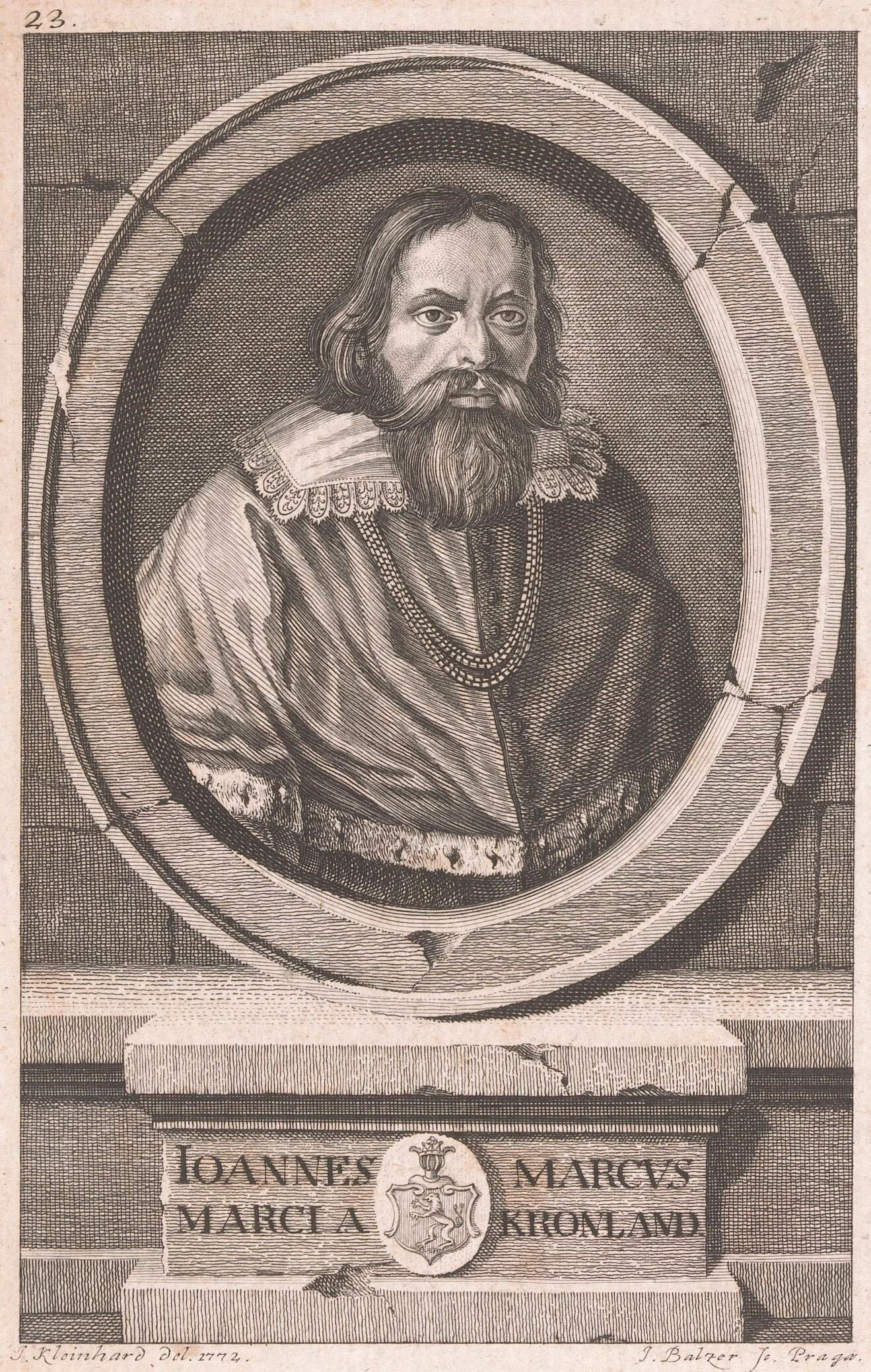
- Born: 13 June 1595; Lanškroun, Moravia, Bohemia
- Died: 10 April 1667 (aged 71); Prague, Bohemia
- Education: University of Olomouc, Olomouc; Charles University, Prague
- Family: Marci
- Scientific career
- Fields: Medicine, mechanics, optics, mathematics
- Workplaces: Charles University, Prague

Jan Marek Marci FRS, also known as Johannes Marcus Marci (German: Johannes Marcus Marci de Cronland; 13 June 1595 – 10 April 1667) was a Czech medical doctor and scientist. He was the rector of the University of Prague and official medical doctor to the Holy Roman Emperors. The crater Marci on the far side of the Moon is named after him.

== Career ==
Marci was born on 13 June 1595 in Lanškroun, near the border between the historical lands Bohemia and Moravia (presently parts of the Czech Republic). He studied under Athanasius Kircher and spent most of his career as a professor of Charles University in Prague, where he served for over thirty years as a professor of medicine, eight times as Dean of the medical school and once as rector in 1662. He was also the personal doctor of emperors Ferdinand III and Leopold I, and distinguished himself in the defense of Prague against the Swedish armies in 1648. In October 1654 he was given the nobility title (falckrabě) "de Kronland" (anagram of "Landskron", German name for the city of Lanškroun). It is contested whether Marci was a member of the Royal Society. Some claim that he was elected as a corresponding member in 1667. Other dispute this and argue that a Fellowship was not granted due to his death in this year. Unlike in the legend spread by Jesuit order, he did not join the Jesuit order shortly before his death.

== Work ==
Marci's studies covered the mechanics of colliding bodies, epilepsy, and the refraction of light, as well as other topics. Prior to Marci, the prevailing theory of color assumed that light was modified by the action of a medium to produce color. Most theories were based upon the assumption that color was simply a modification of light varying between whiteness and blackness. Marci preceded Isaac Newton in his belief that "Light is not changed into colors except by a certain refraction in a dense medium; and the diverse species of colors are the products of refraction." Although he thought that different colors were caused by varying angles of incidence across the 1/2 degree apparent diameter of the sun, he stated that each color was condensed or disentangled from the others after refraction into homogeneous or elementary colors of red, green, blue and purple, and that no further change in color was obtained by additional refraction of elementary colors.

Marci at some time came into possession of the Voynich Manuscript, apparently upon the death of its former owner, the alchemist Georg Baresch. He sent the book to his longtime friend Athanasius Kircher, with a cover letter dated 19 August 1666, or possibly 1665. This cover letter has remained intact and was present when the manuscript was obtained by Wilfrid Voynich.

He is remembered today by the award of an annual medal to distinguished scientists by the Slovak-Czech Spectroscopy Society.

== Books ==
- Operatricum Idea (1635)
- Idearum operaticum idea (1636)
- De proportione motus seu regula sphygmica (1639)
- Thaumantias. Liber de arcu coelesti deque colorum apparentium natura, ortu, et causis (Pragae: typis Academicis, 1648)
- Dissertatio de natura iridis (1650)
- De longitudine seu differentia inter duos meridianos (Praegae: Typis Georgij Schyparz, 1650)
- Labyrinthus, in quo via ad circuli quadraturam pluribus modis exhibetur (1654)
- Philosophia vetus restituta (1662)
- Othosophia seu philosophia impulsus universalis (1683)

A bibliography of Marci is provided by Heinrich Wilhelm Rotermund.
