= Marci Zaroff =

- Born: 13 December
- Occupation: ECOpreneur
- Website: www.marcizaroff.com

Marci Zaroff coined and trademarked the term "ECOfashion" in 1995 and is an ECOlifestyle entrepreneur, educator, and innovator. She believes that Millennials are "“driving the rapidly growing movement for sustainable and ethical fashion.”

Zaroff is an RSA Fellow and a Henry Crown Fellow of The Aspen Institute.

== Early life and education ==
Zaroff grew up in South Florida and has a degree from the Haas Business School of the University of California, Berkeley.

== Career ==
Following her graduation, Zaroff moved to New York City, and in 1990, co-founded The Institute for Integrative Nutrition. Zaroff is the founder and former CEO/President of Under the Canopy, a company she founded in 1996 and led until 2009. Zaroff joined Portico Brand Group in 2011 as president and chief marketing officer.

Zaroff founded MetaWear, a sustainable apparel manufacturing company, in 2012, and in 2019, founded ECOfashion Corporation.

In 2010, Zaroff, along with her husband, Eric Schnell, co-founded the lifestyle brand I AM Enlightened Creations. In 2016, they co-founded BeyondBrands, a conscious brand consulting agency.

She is one of the five co-founders of Good Catch Foods, launched in 2017.

Zaroff was one of the producers of the 2014 documentary Driving Fashion Forward. She is the author of ECOrenaissance: Co-Creating A Stylish, Sexy and Sustainable World, published in 2018 by Simon & Schuster.

Zaroff helped with the development of the Global Organic Textile Standard (GOTS) and first Fair Trade Textile Certification. She is currently a Director/Advisor on several Boards, including Organic Trade Association, Textile Exchange, Fair Trade USA, Fashion Revolution, Fashion Positive, Teens Turning Green.

Zaroff has launched organic/sustainable fiber initiatives in retailers such as Whole Foods Market, Macy's, Target, Bed Bath & Beyond and AVEDA.

== Awards and recognition ==
- Retail Touchpoint's "Retail Innovator Award"
- ABC News' "Legends and Legacies"
- New York Moves "Power Woman Award"
- Fashion Group International's "Rising Star Award"
- ELLE Magazine's "Mercury Style Award"
- Turkish Textile Association "Honorary Member"
- National Product Industry's "Socially Responsible Business Award"

== Personal life ==
Zaroff lives in New York City with her husband, Eric Schnell, and her two children.
