= Marci (crater) =

Crater on the Moon

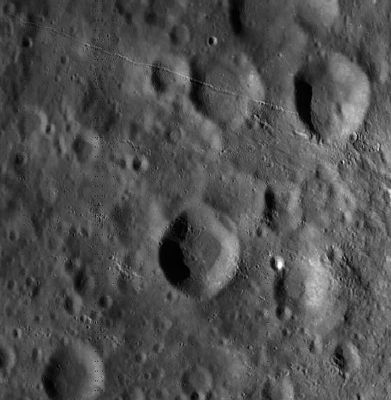
- Marci is below center
- Coordinates: 22.6°N 167.0°W
- Diameter: 25 km
- Depth: Unknown
- Colongitude: 168° at sunrise
- Eponym: Jan Marek Marci

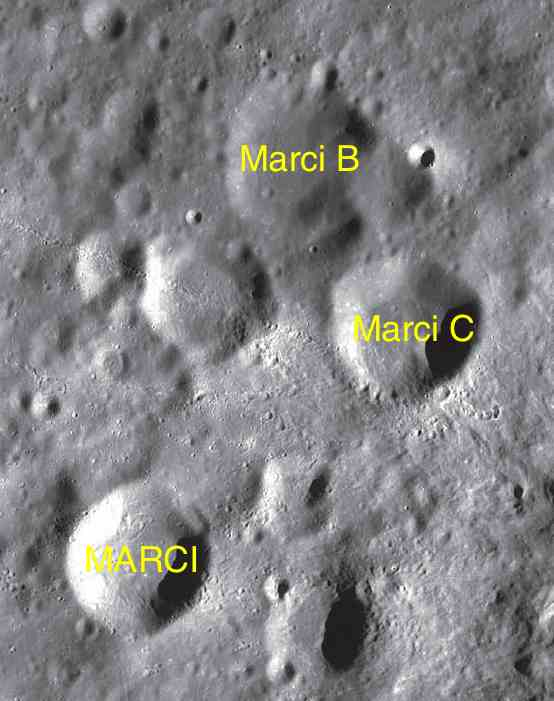
Satellite features of Marci

Marci is a small, mostly unremarkable lunar impact crater on the far side of the Moon. It is located about one crater diameter to the west of the prominent crater Jackson. To the northwest of Marci is the larger crater Fitzgerald.

This is a roughly circular, bowl-shaped feature with slight outward bulges in the rim to the north and south. The inner walls are generally simple slopes the run down to the interior floor. This floor is about half the diameter of the crater. Marci lies within the bright ray system that surrounds Jackson.

== Satellite craters ==
By convention these features are identified on lunar maps by placing the letter on the side of the crater midpoint that is closest to Marci.

Marci	Latitude	Longitude	Diameter
B	25.2° N	166.3° W	28 km
C	24.3° N	165.4° W	26 km
