= Georg Baresch =

Czech antique collector and alchemist (1585–1662)

Georg Baresch (Czech: Jiří Bareš; 1585–1662), was a Bohemian antique collector and alchemist from Prague known for his connection to the Voynich manuscript.

== Biography ==
Baresch received his baccalaureate in 1602. He studied at the Jesuit College of Clementinum.

== Voynich manuscript ==
Georg Baresch was the earliest confirmed owner of the Voynich manuscript. He was apparently just as puzzled as modern cryptologists about this "Sphinx" that had been in his library for many years. On learning that Athanasius Kircher, a Jesuit scholar from the Collegio Romano, had published a Coptic dictionary and "deciphered" Egyptian hieroglyphs, he sent a sample copy of the script to Kircher in Rome, asking for clues. His 1639 letter to Kircher, recently located by Rene Zandbergen, is the earliest known mention of the manuscript.

In 1637, Baresch wrote his first letter to Kircher, and from his later reference to it, we may conclude that he was familiar with Kircher's Prodromus Coptus, which appeared in 1636. He sent this letter via the famous Prague mathematician Theodorus Moretus S.J. This letter (which should have been accompanied by some transcriptions of the Voynich manuscript) is lost. After no reply was forthcoming from Kircher, he sent a second letter in 1639. This letter has been preserved, though another copy of transcription material from the Voynich manuscript that was sent along with it is also lost.

From his 1639 letter, it appears that Baresch had already owned the Voynich manuscript for some time when he wrote his first letter. He also presents Kircher with his view that the Voynich manuscript represents 'Egyptian science' and shows that he may have been familiar with botany. This letter was sent from Prague, but due to the absence of Baresch's name in the tax rolls called 'Berní Rula' (31), we know that he did not own a house in Prague.
