= Anthony Ascham (astrologer) =

English astrologer (fl. 1550s)

Anthony Ascham (fl. 1553), was an English astrologer.

He was born at Kirby Wiske, near Northallerton, Yorkshire, the third son of John Ascham (d. 1544) of Kirby Wiske, who was a yeoman farmer and steward to Lord Scrope of Bolton, and his wife, Margaret. Ascham studied at Cambridge, became M.B. in 1540, and in 1553 was presented by Edward VI to the vicarage of Burneston, Yorkshire. He is probably to be identified with Anthony, the brother of Roger Ascham (cf. Grant's Vita Axchami in Ascham's Works, ed. Giles, iv. 307).

== Works ==
- 'A Little Herbal,' by Ant. Askam, 1550.
- 'Anthonie Ascham his Treatise of Astronomie, declaring what Herbs and all Kinde of Medicines are appropriate, and also under the influence of the Planets, Signs, & Constellations,' 1550.
- 'A Treatise of Astronomy, declaring the Leap Year and what is the Cause thereof; and how to know St. Matthis Day for ever, with the marvellous motion of the Sun both in his proper circle, and by the moving that he hath of the 10th, 9th, and 8th sphere,' London, 1552, 8vo.
- 'A Prognostication and an Almanack made for the Year of our Lord God, 1550.'
- 'An Almanacke or Prognostication,' &c., for 1552. 6. The like for 1555.
- The like for 1557.
- 'Treatise made 1547 of the State and Disposition of the World, with the alteration and changing thereof through the highest planets, called Maxima, Major, Media, and Minor, declaring the very time of the day, houre, and minute that God created the Sunne, Moone, and Starres, and the places where they were first set in the Heavens and the beginning of their movings, and so continued to this day, &c.' Loudon, 1558.

Ascham is also the suggested author, by some researchers, of the Voynich manuscript.
