= Hut 7 =

British wartime section tasked with breaking Japanese naval codes

Coordinates: 51.99773°N 0.74018°W

Hut 7 was a wartime section of the Government Code and Cypher School at Bletchley Park tasked with the solution of Japanese naval codes such as JN4, JN11, JN40, and JN-25. The hut was headed by Hugh Foss who reported to Frank Birch, the head of Bletchley's Naval section.

Hut 7 supplied cryptanalysts and linguists to Bletchley's front line station the Far East Combined Bureau (FECB) at Hong Kong, then Singapore, then Anderson Station (Colombo, Ceylon, now Sri Lanka), then Allidina School in Kilindini, Kenya before moving back to Colombo.

Bletchley co-operated with the US Navy Code and Signals Section known as OP-20-G in Washington D.C., and with FRUMEL in Melbourne (although the reciprocal cooperation from Fabian at FRUMEL was limited and reluctant); see Central Bureau and FRUMEL.

== Pre-War origins ==
Among the first challenges was overcoming the special kana and romaji Morse code system used by the Japanese. GC&CS began breaking Japanese diplomatic traffic in the early 1920s. GC&CS subsequently attacked the Naval Reporting Code, and General Operations Code.

The section was headed by William "Nobby" Clarke with Harry Shaw and Ernest Hobart-Hampden. These were later joined by Eric Nave, seconded from the Royal Australian Navy, John Tiltman, and Hugh Foss.

GC&CS operated the Far East Combined Bureau, the codebreaking and intercept station in Hong Kong prewar, which during the war moved to Singapore, Colombo and Kilindini.

== WWII expansion ==
Potential linguists and cryptographers were recruited from the University of Cambridge and the University of Oxford by referral through people like the Revd Martin Charlesworth, A.D. Lindsay, Dr C. P. Snow, and Theodore Chaundy. Candidates were interviewed and approved by a board that included Colonel Tiltman. Successful candidates received a final interview at Bletchley by a senior representative of their section.

At the outset of World War II, Britain had few Japanese linguists and conventional wisdom held that it would require two years to produce qualified linguists for the war effort. In February 1942, an accelerated program was established to train linguists to assist with Japanese signals intelligence. Candidates were put through an intensive six-month course taught by Captain Oswald Tuck, RN. The course was taught in various locations in Bedford including the Gas Company. The course produced linguists for the Navy, Army, Air Force, and Foreign Office. Some of the linguists were sent on to Bletchley, while others were sent to London to work with Captain Malcolm Kennedy.

Later cryptanalysts did not require linguistic training, so could be recruited and put to work directly. Some of these cryptanalysts received a shorter version of the Japanese language course.

The Japanese Naval Section was originally stationed at the Elmer School near Bletchley. By August 1942, the unit consisted of 40 people. The unit was moved inside Bletchley Park in September and again in February 1943 to Hut 7. The unit expanded (or moved) later to Block B.

The wooden structure of the hut was demolished sometime between 1948 and 1954.

== Contributions ==
In addition to code books and manual ciphers, the Imperial Japanese Navy also utilized electric cipher machines known as JADE and CORAL using the same technology as PURPLE. While OP-20-G took the lead on these systems, Bletchley provided some contributions.

In 1921, GC&CS was able to provide insight into the Japanese bargaining position at the Washington Naval Conference of the nine major powers and limit their ambitions.

Pre-war accomplishments were helped tremendously by the death of Emperor Taishō in 1926. The repetition of the formal announcement provided GC&CS with cribs into almost every code in use. Later in 1934, Foss was able to break an early Japanese cipher machine.

Tiltman provided the major break into JN25 in 1939.

In early 1942, decrypts from Anderson gave advance warning of Vice Admiral Nagumo's Indian Ocean raid including a planned attack on Colombo. The warning allowed the British to limit damage, improve opposition, and evacuate the fleet and the cryptanalysts from Colombo to Kilindini.

In May 1945, the team at HMS Anderson successfully broke a message in JN25 that provided details of a supply convoy going from Singapore to the Andaman Islands. This message provided details that led to the sinking of the Japanese cruiser Haguro in the Battle of the Malacca Strait.

== List of Hut 7 personnel ==
The following people served in Hut 7, HMS Anderson, and Kilindini:

- Sidney Abramson, translator at Anderson
- Brian Augarde, mathematician, sub-section chief at Bletchley, worked on JN11
- Peter Barnett, translator at Anderson
- Lieutenant-Commander Barnham, translator at Kilindini
- Charles Bawden, linguist at Anderson
- Ted Biggs, ex-diplomat, Kilindini, Anderson, and Melbourne
- Gerry Brennan, cryptanalyst at Bletchley, worked on JN40
- Leo Brouwer, Lieutenant-Commander RNN; a Japanese linguist from Kamer 14 (Java); Colombo, Kilindini, Hut 7
- Maurice Burnett, linguist at Anderson
- John Catlow, linguist at Anderson
- Dudley Cheke, Kilindini
- Jon Cohen, linguist/cryptanalyst temporarily assigned to Diplomatic Section, later to Bletchley, and Kilindini
- Lieutenant-Commander E.H. Colgrave
- George Curnock, translator at Singapore, Anderson and Kilindini
- Brenda Scott Curtis, cryptanalyst Bletchley Park
- Wynn Davies, translator/cryptanalyst at Bletchley and Kilindini
- Denny Denham, translator at Anderson
- Hugh Denham, cryptanalyst at Bletchley, Kilindini, and Anderson, worked on JN25
- Alan Douglas, linguist temporarily assigned to Diplomatic Section
- John English, sub-section chief at Bletchley
- Harry Field, Anderson
- Frederick (Freddy) Freeborn, head of the Hollerith index section in Hut 7 (later Block C), ex-head of BTM's Letchworth factory.
- Forman, Kilindini
- Hugh Foss, head of Hut 7
- Daphne Goff, Foreign Office, Hollerith operator
- Diana Goff, Foreign Office, Hollerith operator
- Christy Maggie Mackinnon, Foreign Office, Hollerith operator
- Capt. Joshua David Goldberg, Japanese codebreaker
- Sergeant Harris-Jones, assistant translator at Bletchley
- Hubert Eustace Hooper, linguist at Anderson
- George Hunter, linguist at Anderson
- Hayden John, cryptanalyst, ran JN40 group at Bletchley
- Lieutenant-Commander Bruce Keith, translator at Bletchley
- Sub Lieutenant Anthony Richard Michael Kelly (RNVR), linguist - Japanese
- Johnnie Lambert, cryptanalyst at Bletchley and Anderson
- Peter Laslett, cryptanalyst at Bletchley, worked on JN11
- Elsie May Lait, Hut 7 FO civilian
- Peter Lawrence, translator at Anderson
- John Lloyd, language instructor at Bletchley
- Michael Loewe, linguist/cryptanalyst at Bletchley and Kilindini
- Alexander Murray Macbeath, cryptanalyst at Bletchley.
- John MacInnes, cryptanalyst at Kilindini
- Norman Mahalski (later Scott), mathematician / cryptanalyst at Bletchley and Anderson, worked on JN11 and JN25
- Commander McIntyre RN, translator, at Kilindini and ran JN25 group at Bletchley
- Joan Meikle, Foreign Office, Bletchley
- Alan Merry, translator at Melbourne, Kilindini, and ran JN40 group at Anderson
- Milner, support at Anderson
- George Mitchell, Anderson
- Alexander Sandy Morris, Anderson
- Lieutenant Commander Philip L Nicol RN, linguistics and Cryptanalyst - Japanese at Bletchley.
- Commander Parsons RN, translator at Kilindini
- Jimmy Pollard, cryptanalyst at Bletchley, worked on JN40
- Pond, support at Anderson
- Fred Ponting, cryptanalyst at Bletchley, worked on JN11
- John Sharman, cryptanalyst at Anderson and Kilindini
- John Silkin, linguist at Anderson
- Stanton, cryptanalyst at Kilindini
- John Sutcliffe, cryptanalyst at Bletchley
- Patrick Taylor, mathematician at Bletchley
- Wilf Taylor, linguist at Anderson
- Captain Dick Thatcher RN, worked on JN 25 at Bletchley, was at FECB Hong Kong
- Brian Townend, cryptanalyst at Kilindini, contributed a break into JN40
- Richard Wolfe, Anderson
- Leslie Yoxall, cryptanalyst at Bletchley, previously working in Hut 8
- Marjorie Elsie Donkin, FO Civillian
