= Denniston =

Denniston may refer to:

== People ==
- Alastair Denniston (1881–1961), British codebreaker
- Elaine Denniston (born 1939), lawyer, supported the Apollo program
- James Dennistoun (1805-1855), Scottish advocate and antiquarian
- John Dewar Denniston (1887–1949), British classical scholar
- Lyle Denniston, American legal journalist and professor
- Robert Denniston (1800–67), American lawyer and politician
- Robin Denniston (1926–2012), British publisher, son of Alastair
- Thomas Denniston (1821–97), New Zealand farmer and newspaper editor
- D. J. Moore (born 1997), NFL Football Player

== Places ==
- Denniston, New Zealand
- Denniston, former name of Olivehurst, California
- Denniston, Kentucky, United States
- Denniston Creek, California, United States
- Denniston House, Cassville, Wisconsin, United States

== See also ==
- Deniston (disambiguation)
- Dennistoun, a district in Glasgow, Scotland
  - Dennistoun (ward), local government locality centred on the above district
