= Far East Combined Bureau =

UK intelligence outstation

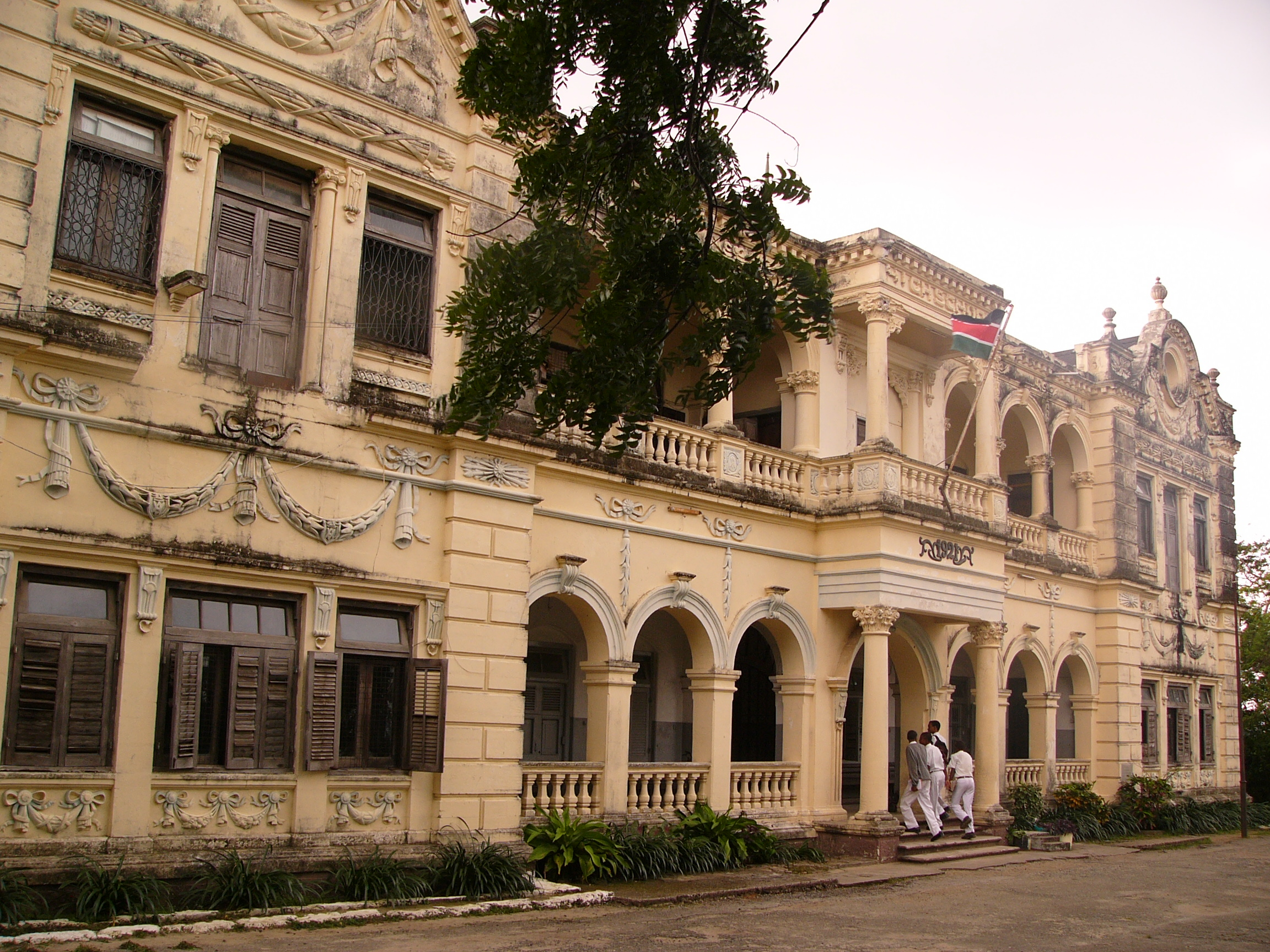
Allidina Visram school in Mombasa, pictured above in 2006, was the location of the FECB "Kilindini" codebreaking outpost during World War II

The Far East Combined Bureau, an outstation of the British Government Code and Cypher School, was set up in Hong Kong in March 1935, to monitor Japanese, and also Chinese and Russian (Soviet) intelligence and radio traffic. Later it moved to Singapore, Colombo (Ceylon), Kilindini (Kenya), then returned to Colombo.

The Colombo site was known as HMS Anderson or Station Anderson.

== Hong Kong ==
The FECB was located in an office block in the Naval dockyard, with an armed guard at the door (which negated any attempt at secrecy). The intercept site was on Stonecutters Island, four miles across the harbour, and staffed by a dozen RAF and RN ratings (plus later four Army signallers). The codebreaking or Y section had Japanese, Chinese and Russian interpreters, under RN Paymaster Henry (Harry) Shaw, with Dick Thatcher and Neil Barnham. The FECB was headed by the Chief of Intelligence Staff (COIS) Captain John Waller, later by Captain F. J. Wylie.

Shaw had been dealing direct with GC&CS and the C-in-C Far East in Shanghai, but found that Waller expected that everything should go through him, and paid little regard to keeping sources secret. So by 1936 the two most senior naval officers were barely on speaking terms. Colonel Valentine Burkhart found when he arrived in 1936 that the bureau was involved in “turf wars”, although they eventually accepted that they had no control over the use of intelligence reports.

Initially the Y section was to focus on the three main Japanese Navy codes and cyphers; the Japanese Naval General Cypher, the Flag Officer code and the "tasogare" or basic naval reporting code used to report the sailings of individual ships. In 1938 a section was set up to attack Japanese commercial systems and so to track supply convoys. From 1936 many messages were sent back to London, to be deciphered by John Tiltman, who broke the first version of JN-25 in 1939.

== Singapore ==
In August 1939, shortly before the outbreak of war with Germany, the FECB moved to Singapore on HMS Birmingham for fear of Japanese attack. A skeleton staff of a codebreaker (Alf Bennett) and four intercept operators were left at Hong Kong, and they were captured by the Japanese on Christmas Day 1941.

FECB went to Seletar Naval Base, and the intercept station to Kranji. An RAF "Y" interception unit, 52 Wireless Unit, arrived in Singapore in early November 1941. As Bletchley Park was concentrating on German Enigma cyphers, many of the Japanese naval section in Hut 7 moved to FECB, Singapore. By May 1940 there were forty people working solely on JN-25, who could read simple messages. The new codebook JN-25B was introduced on 1 December 1940, but was broken immediately as the additives were not changed.

There was interchange with Station CAST at Corregidor, which was better placed to intercept IJN messages, as FECB could only receive the Combined Fleet in home waters at night. FECB also collaborated with the US Army Station 6 intercept site at Fort McKinley near Manila. FECB was sent one of the American Purple machines from Bletchley Park in a warship. Supposed to be sent only by warship or military transport, it was trans-shipped at Durban to the freighter Sussex. The ship's Master said he landed it at the Naval Store Singapore at the end of December 1941, but the Naval Stores Officer denied any knowledge of it; hopefully it was destroyed or dumped in the sea. But the Hollerith tabulating machine (minus a key part, which had to be borrowed from the Indian State Railways in Bombay) arrived safely in Colombo.

FECB also cooperated with Kamer 14 (Room 14), the Dutch unit at the Bandung Technical College in Java. Initially some of the FECB people went there after the fall of Singapore. Lieutenant-Commander Leo Brouwer RNN, a Japanese linguist at Kamer 14 was evacuated to Colombo, then Kilindini, and later Hut 7.

== Colombo, Ceylon ==
With the Japanese advance down the Malay Peninsula, the Army and RAF codebreakers went to the Wireless Experimental Centre in Delhi, India.

The RN codebreakers went to Colombo, Ceylon in January 1942, on the troopship HMS Devonshire (with 12 codebreakers' cars as deck cargo). Pembroke College, an Indian boys school, was requisitioned as a combined codebreaking and wireless interception centre. The FECB worked for Admiral Sir James Somerville, commander-in-chief of the Royal Navy's Eastern Fleet.

Initially the Bureau wanted to move to Australia, but were reportedly told by the Director of Signals Communication, Lieutenant Commander Jack B. Newman that facilities were not available. Many have since been baffled why they were told that, though Newman "had no intention of letting the British arrive and run the show"; they wanted to commandeer all Australia's intercept stations for their own use.

== Kilindini, Kenya ==
In April 1942 most of the RN codebreakers at Colombo moved to Kilindini near Mombasa in Kenya, because of a Japanese task force attack on Colombo. Two codebreakers and the civilian wireless operators were left in Colombo. An Indian boys school at Allidina about a mile outside Mombasa and overlooking the Indian Ocean was requisitioned, hence the name HMS Allidina.

Radio reception was even worse than at Colombo, with only the strongest Japanese signals received. In addition, FRUMEL – the US-Australian-British unit based in Melbourne that replaced CAST – was reluctant to exchange material. The American commander Rudolph Fabian was a difficult man to work with, was prejudiced against the British and had a personality clash with Eric Nave (although Nave was Australian, he was a Royal Navy officer). There were also complaints about Fabian and FRUMEL from MacArthur's headquarters, although MacArthur was not particularly concerned (see also Central Bureau).

But in September 1942 Kilindini was able to break the Japanese Merchant Shipping Code (JN-40), because a message was sent twice with extra data. It was a transposition cypher, not a super-enciphered code like JN-25. They also broke JN-152 a simple transposition and substitution cypher for navigation warnings and the previously impenetrable JN-167, another merchant shipping cypher. These successes enabled Allied forces e.g. submarines to attack Japanese supply ships, and resulted in the Japanese merchant marine suffering 90 per cent losses by August 1945.

== Return to Colombo ==
FECB then moved back to Colombo; the move began in August 1943, with the advance party arriving in Ceylon on 1 September. Eight Wren Typex operators were killed in February 1944, when their ship the Khedive Ismail en route from Kenya to Ceylon was sunk by a Japanese submarine.

The location chosen was the Anderson Golf Course six miles from Colombo HQ, hence the name HMS Anderson. Bruce Keith had wanted an up-country site for better reception, but the Chief of Intelligence staff for HQ Eastern Fleet insisted that the codebreakers should be within easy reach of headquarters. While reception was better than at Kilindini, it was affected by a nearby 33 Kv power line and the Racecourse Aerodrome.

In the 1950s, GCHQ developed a new site that could monitor signals from all direction at Perkar to replace HMS Anderson, at a cost of £2 million (equivalent to £43,527,672 in 2023), without explaining the purpose to the Ceylon government. Following the Suez War the Ceylon government decided all British bases should close, because they believed Ceylon bases had been used to refuel British ships involved in the Suez War, and the Perkar facility and HMS Anderson were abandoned within five years.

== Henry Shaw ==
Paymaster Henry (Harry) Livingston Shaw was a Royal Navy codebreaker at the FECB on Hong Kong and then Singapore. He founded the FECB, and headed the diplomatic section. His rank was Paymaster Captain, later Lieutenant Commander. When a RN language student in Japan in the 1920s, he achieved 810 out of 1000 (81%) in a test at the British Embassy (Eric Nave got 910)

== Other British stations ==
- Wireless Experimental Centre, Delhi

== Conclusion ==
Smith wrote that: Only now are the British codebreakers (like John Tiltman, Hugh Foss and Eric Nave) beginning to receive the recognition they deserve for breaking Japanese codes and cyphers.

== Sources ==
- Bou, Jean (2012). MacArthur's Secret Bureau: The story of the Central Bureau. Loftus NSW Australia: Australian Military History Publications. ISBN 978-0-9872387-1-9.
- Dufty, David (2017). The Secret Code-Breakers of Central Bureau. Melbourne, London: Scribe. ISBN 9781925322187.
- Elphick, Peter: Far Eastern File: The Intelligence War in the Far East 1930-1945 (1997 & 1998, Hodder & Stoughton, London) ISBN 0-340-66584-X
- Jenkins, David (1992). Battle surface : Japan's submarine war against Australia 1942-44. Milsons Point, N.S.W.: Random House Australia. ISBN 0-09-182638-1.
- Smith, Michael (2000). The emperor's codes : Bletchley Park and the breaking of Japan's secret ciphers. London: Bantam Press. ISBN 0-593-04642-0.
- Smith, Michael (2001). "Chapter 8: An Undervalued Effort: how the British broke Japan's Codes". In Smith, Michael; Erskine, Ralph (eds.). Action this day. London: Bantam. pp. 127–151. ISBN 0-593-04910-1.
- Smith, Michael (2015). The Debs of Bletchley Park. London: Aurum Press. ISBN 978-1-78131-191-2.
- Stripp, Alan: Codebreaker in the Far East (1989, Oxford University Press) ISBN 0-19-280386-7
