= James Rusbridger =

British author and historian

- Born: 26 February 1928; Jamaica
- Died: 16 February 1994 (aged 65); Tremorebridge, Cornwall, England
- Cause of death: Asphyxiation
- Known for: Books on international espionage

James Rusbridger (26 February 1928 – 16 February 1994) was a British author and historian on international espionage during and after World War II.

== Biography ==
He was born in Jamaica, son of Gordon Rusbridger an Army colonel, and died in Tremorebridge, Cornwall.

His career started in the naval design office of Vickers Armstrong. Then he was salesman and managing director of a commodities firm specialising in sugar, and claimed to have been paid by the CIA to weaken the international market for Cuban sugar. He was an Eastern Europe courier for MI6 (or the British Secret Intelligence Service) from 1962, retiring in 1974. His books mainly relate to World War II, but his letters and articles after retirement were critical of British and American agencies.

In his books he asserted that:

- Betrayal at Pearl Harbor: Winston Churchill concealed warnings about Pearl Harbor from Franklin D. Roosevelt in order to get America in the war. But In a 1991 interview on Japanese television his co-author Eric Nave "repudiated a large slice of what Rusbridger had written, calling it speculation."
- Who Sank Surcouf: The French submarine Surcouf sank as the result of an accident; and had a confused, treacherous, incompetent and disloyal crew.

In May 1989 Rusbridger made an extended appearance on the Channel 4 discussion programme After Dark, alongside Tony Benn, Lord Dacre, Miles Copeland and others.

In February 1994 Rusbridger, aged 65, was found dead of asphyxiation at a rented cottage in Bodmin Moor, Cornwall. His body was found hanged from a beam, wearing a black oilskin coat and a gas mask. His neck and ankles were connected via a series of pulleys to a rope. At the time he had recently suffered a heart attack, and was heavily in debt.
