= Rosa Beddington =

English developmental biologist

- Born: Rosa Susan Penelope Beddington; 23 March 1956; Hampshire, England, UK
- Died: 18 May 2001 (aged 45); Great Tew, Oxfordshire, England, UK
- Education: Brasenose College, Oxford (BA, PhD)
- Known for: Anterior-posterior patterning in mammalian embryos
- Spouse: Robin Denniston
- Awards: Waddington Medal (1999); Lister fellowship; FRS (1999)
- Scientific career
- Fields: Developmental biology
- Workplaces: University of Oxford; Imperial Cancer Research Fund; Cold Spring Harbor Laboratory; National Institute for Medical Research; Centre for Genome Research, Edinburgh
- Thesis: Studies on cell fate and cell potency in the postimplantation mammalian embryo (1981)
- Doctoral advisor: Richard Gardner; Virginia Papaioannou

Rosa Susan Penelope Beddington FRS (23 March 1956 – 18 May 2001) was a British biologist whose career had a major impact on developmental biology.

== Education and early life ==
Beddington was born on 23 March 1956, the second daughter of Roy and Anna Beddington (née Griffith). She was raised with her elder sister, Pippa Beddington. She attended Sherborne School for Girls where she not only excelled in academics, but in her arts and sports programs as well. She later attended Brasenose College, Oxford; from 1974, obtaining a First in Physiological Sciences in 1977. She was the first woman to earn a first-class undergraduate degree at Brasenose. Beddington embarked on the study of anterior-posterior axial patterning in mammalian embryos, beginning with her doctoral thesis entitled, "Studies on cell fate and cell potency in the postimplantation mammalian embryo" supervised by Richard Gardner and Virginia Papaioannou, and was awarded a DPhil in 1981.

== Career ==
Beddington published numerous high-profile papers in her relatively short career (several important papers being published posthumously). She worked extensively on the developmental genetics of axial patterning, germ layer specification, and other phenomena of gastrulation in mammals, including demonstrating that the node is the organizer in mammals. Her technical contributions to experimental embryology include surgical re-implantation into the uterus to extend the time an experimentally manipulated embryo can be cultured and the use of a transgenic marker (beta-galactosidase) to identify transplant versus host tissue in experimental embryos.

While a fellow at the Imperial Cancer Research Fund, (now Cancer Research UK) laboratory in Oxford, Beddington and Elizabeth Robertson recognised the potential of embryonic stem cells for the study of genetic manipulation after demonstrating the ability of these cells to colonise developing embryos.

Beddington taught at the newly established Cold Spring Harbor Laboratories summer course on manipulating the mouse embryo from 1986, including two years as co-organiser with Robertson. Beddington was the meetings secretary for the British Society for Developmental Biology (BSDB) from 1990 to 1995. In 1993, she established and led a Division of Mammalian Development at the National Institute for Medical Research. She became on the first women to excel in this area of STEM at the time.

== Awards and honours ==
The Waddington medal designed by Rosa Beddington

A talented artist, she designed the Waddington Medal, awarded for outstanding performance and contribution to the field of developmental biology. Beddington herself received the Waddington Medal in 1999. Additionally, the British Society for Developmental Biology has established in her honor The Beddington Medal, a national prize given for the most outstanding PhD dissertation in developmental biology in the previous year. Its design is based upon drawings by Beddington. Her nomination for the Royal Society reads:

Beddington's work has combined classical embryology with molecular genetics. She has established using her great skills in micromanipulation, many of the key features of gastrulation in the mouse, a fundamental process in mammalian development. She was the first to demonstrate the axis-inducing activity of the mouse node and to show that the epiblast gives rise to all the adult organs. Most recently she has identified two homeobox genes involved in the specification of anterior structures, including the forebrain. This work provides the first evidence that axial pattern in mammalian development originates in extra-embryonic tissue and that anterior identity is established before the formation of the primitive streak. It provides new insights into antero-posterior patterning throughout the vertebrates.

== Personal life ==
Beddington was married to Robin Denniston. She died on 18 May 2001 from complications of cancer.
