= Mary D'Imperio =

American cryptographer (1930–2020)

- Born: January 13, 1930
- Died: May 28, 2020 (aged 90)
- Education: Radcliffe College; University of Pennsylvania
- Known for: cryptographer and computer programmer

Mary D'Imperio (January 13, 1930, in Germantown, Pennsylvania – May 28, 2020, in Springfield, Virginia) was an American cryptographer.

== Biography ==
Mary D'Imperio was born in Germantown, Pennsylvania, January 13, 1930. Her father was the Philadelphia sculptor, Dominic D'Imperio.

D'Imperio received degrees in comparative philology and classics from Radcliffe College from which she graduated magna cum laude, and structural linguistics from the University of Pennsylvania. She was elected a member of Phi Beta Kappa at Radcliffe in 1950.

Between 1960 and 1962, D'Imperio created the TEMAC (Text Macro Compiler) language for processing text. From 1987 to 2006, she was a frequent contributor to North American Breeding Bird Survey reports.

She was introduced to the problem of the Voynich Manuscript by John Tiltman in 1975. She wrote several books and journal articles about the manuscript. These include The Voynich Manuscript: An Elegant Enigma, The Voynich Manuscript: A Scholarly Mystery, and An Application of Cluster Analysis and Multiple Scaling to the Question of "Hands" and "Languages" in the Voynich Manuscript.

According to a 1976 introduction by Vera Filby: "Her career has been with the government since 1951. She was a linguist and cryptanalyst, but thought of herself mainly as a computer programmer".

She died May 28, 2020, in Springfield, Virginia.

== Selected works ==
- D'Imperio, Mary E. (1951). A phonematic analysis of the Etruscan mummy-wrapping text (A.B., Honors in Comparative Philology). Radcliffe College.
- D'Imperio, Mary Evelyn (1955). A survey of decipherment (M.A. in Linguistics). Graduate School of Arts and Sciences, University of Pennsylvania.
- D'Imperio, Mary E. (1956). Tamil Grammar Notes. Washington, D.C.: Foreign Service Institute, Department of State.
- D'Imperio, M. E. (1965). "TEMAC (Text Macro Compiler): A Machine Language for Processing Text". NSA Technical Journal. X (3).
- D'Imperio, M. E. (1969). "Data Structures and their representation in storage". Annual Review in Automatic Programming. 5: 1–75. doi:10.1016/0066-4138(69)90036-6.
- D'Imperio, M. E. (1969). "Information structures: Tools in problem solving". ACM SIGMOD Record. 1 (2): 25–51. doi:10.1145/983038.983042. S2CID 19133092.
- D'Imperio, Mary (1972). "The Open Door: Camino" (PDF). Dragon Seeds. 1 (2). National Security Agency: 15–18 (PDF pages 59–62).
- D'Imperio, M. E. (1976). New research on the Voynich manuscript : proceedings of a seminar 30 November 1976 (PDF).
- D'Imperio, M. E. (1977–1978). "The Voynich Manuscript: A Scholarly Mystery". Manuscripts. OCLC 28211922.
- D'Imperio, M. E. (1978). The Voynich Manuscript: An Elegant Enigma (PDF). Fort George G. Meade, MD: National Security Agency/Central Security Service. OCLC 50929259. Archived from the original (PDF) on August 20, 2016.
- D'Imperio, Mary E. (1978). "An Application of Cluster Analysis and Multiple Scaling to the Question of "Hands" and "Languages" in the Voynich Manuscript" (PDF). NSA Technical Journal. XXIII (3).
- D'Imperio, M. E. (1978). "The Joys of Unix" (PDF). Cryptolog. 42: 15–18.
- D'Imperio, Mary E. (1979). "An Application of PTAH to the Voynich Manuscript" (PDF). NSA Technical Journal. XXIV (2).

"List of articles by Mary D'Imperio in Cryptolog (Name redacted in the original; references begin with Feb 75 CAMINO News)" (PDF). National Security Agency.
