= Polharrow Burn =

Watercourse in Scotland

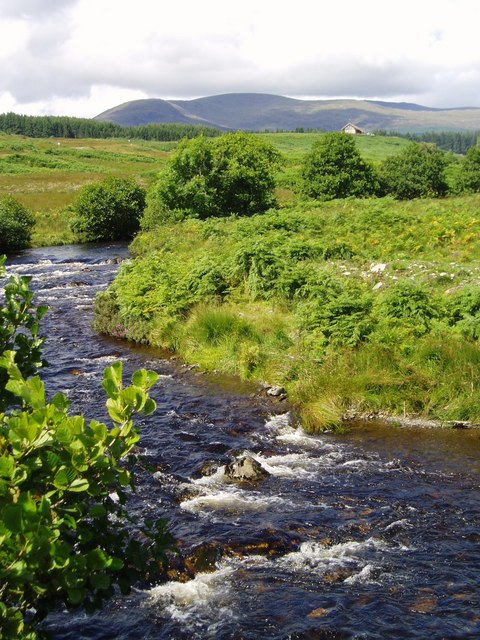
- The Polharrow Burn and Green House

Location
- Country: United Kingdom, Scotland
- Region: Dumfries and Galloway
- District: Kirkcudbrightshire

Physical characteristics
- Source: Loch Harrow
  - location: Knocknalling, Dumfries and Galloway, Scotland
  - coordinates: 55°09′09″N 4°18′42″W
  - elevation: 250 m (820 ft)
- Mouth
  - location: Water of Ken
  - coordinates: 55°08′02″N 4°11′30″W
  - elevation: 83 m (272 ft)
- Length: 8.6 km (5.3 mi)

Basin features
- Tributaries
  - left: Lumford Burn, Polcardie Burn
  - right: Burnhead Burn, Largvey Burn, Crummy Burn

Polharrow Burn is a small watercourse in Dumfries and Galloway, Scotland, in the historic county of Kirkcudbrightshire. It rises in Loch Harrow and flows towards St John's Town of Dalry before joining the Water of Ken.

== Etymology ==
Polharrow is a Gaelic name formed from the words poll 'stream' and airbhe 'wall, fence'. The Scots word burn has been added later, when the meaning of poll in the name became opaque. The word airbhe is also found in Loch Harrow. It is not clear if the loch gave rise to the name of the burn or vice versa. Maxwell proposed a derivation meaning 'the bull's burn', taking the second element to be thairbh 'of a bull'. This derivation is considered to be 'unlikely'.

== Dance ==
It gives its name to a Scottish country dance by the cryptographer and Scottish country dance deviser Hugh Foss, which appeared in his Glendarroch Scottish Country Dance Collection in 1966. He published several volumes of these from his own impress, Glendarroch Press. He lived in his retirement at Glendarroch in St John's Town of Dalry and died in 1971.
