= Deniston =

Deniston may refer to:

== People ==
- Brian Deniston, member of the band Slik
- Charles Rankin Deniston (born 1835), member of the Wisconsin State Assembly
- David Deniston Smith (born 1950), American businessman
- Denis Marshall (footballer) (Deniston Clive Marshall, born 1940), Australian rules footballer
- Matthew Deniston, American political candidate, see 2012 United States House of Representatives elections
- Robert Deniston Hume (1845–1908), cannery owner, pioneer hatchery operator, politician, author, and self-described "pygmy monopolist"
- Shan Deniston (1919–2020), American athlete and sports coach

== Other ==
- Deniston Russell, a character in Laughter in Paradise
- Godfrey, Ontario, a community originally known as Deniston
- Longfellow School (Swissvale, Pennsylvania), also known as Deniston School

== See also ==
- Denniston (disambiguation)
