= Robin Denniston =

- Born: 25 December 1926; London, England, UK
- Died: 6 April 2012 (aged 85)
- Education: Westminster School; Christ Church, Oxford
- Occupations: Publisher, author, minister
- Spouses: Anne Evans (m. 1950; died 1985) Rosa Beddington (m. 1987; died 2001)
- Children: 3
- Parent(s): Alastair Denniston; Dorothy Gilliat

Robin Denniston (25 December 1926 – 6 April 2012) was a British publisher, author and minister. He worked for Collins, Hodder and Stoughton, Weidenfeld & Nicolson, Thomson Publications and Oxford University Press. The Guardian indicated in his obituary that Denniston had "commissioned some of the most popular novels of the 20th century", while The Telegraph credits him with reversing Oxford University Press's economic misfortunes. He was a clergyman in the Church of England.

== Personal life and education ==
The son of teacher and military intelligence specialist Commander Alastair Denniston and his wife and coworker, Dorothy Mary Gilliat, Robin Denniston was born in London. He attended Westminster School from autumn 1941. He studied classics at Christ Church, Oxford and served a stint in the Airborne Artillery.

He was married twice, first to Anne Evans from 1950 to 1985. Following her death from colon cancer, he wed the prominent developmental biologist Rosa Beddington in 1987, remaining with her until her death from cancer in 2001. He had three children, two daughters and a son, all with his first wife. Denniston died on 6 April 2012 following a lengthy illness.

== Publishing career ==
After national service, Denniston took a position in 1950 as a trainee in Glasgow with Collins, rising to head office and becoming an editor. In 1959, he served a year as managing director of Faith Press. In 1960, he went to Hodder and Stoughton, where his positions including editorial director and managing director. He remained with Hodder and Stoughton until 1973. He held brief positions at Weidenfelt (1973-1975) and Thomson Publications (1975-1977) before settling at Oxford University Press as chairman of the academic division. According to The Telegraph, Denniston was responsible for rescuing Oxford UP from the dire financial straits in which he found it, with important changes including short run printing and a shifting focus from general publishing to academic and scientific. By the time of his departure from Oxford UP in 1988, he was second in command.

The Guardian indicated in his obituary that Denniston had "commissioned some of the most popular novels of the 20th century". Among other authors, Denniston is credited with working with John Le Carré through 16 bestselling novels, Anthony Sampson (with Anatomy of Britain and its successors) and Erich Segal's Love Story.

== Ministry ==
Denniston's became first a deacon and then, in 1979, a priest in the Anglican Church. In the 1970s he was an honorary curate, following which he became a stipendiary minister in Great Tew from 1987-1990. In 1990, he served three years as a minister in Fife Scotland. Thereafter, he was persuaded by its parishioners to return to Great Tew as its priest, from 1995 to 2002.

== Authorship ==
In addition to publishing, Denniston was an author. An early novel, Young Musicians (1955), reflected his life long musical interests. Anatomy of Scotland (1992) was co-edited with Magnus Linklater. In 1997, he published Churchill's Secret War and in 1999 Trevor Huddleston: A Life. His labour of love was Thirty Secret Years (2007), describing his father's life and work assembling the team at Bletchley Park behind Ultra, the WW2 codebreaking intelligence system.
