= Leslie Yoxall =

British cryptographer

- Born: Albert Leslie Yoxall; 18 May 1914; Salford, Lancashire, England
- Died: 30 September 2005 (aged 91)
- Education: Manchester Grammar School; Sidney Sussex College, Cambridge
- Spouse: Doris Gibson (m. 1949; died 2002)

Albert Leslie Yoxall (18 May 1914 – 30 September 2005) was a British codebreaker at Bletchley Park during World War II. He devised a method to assist in solving Enigma messages which was dubbed Yoxallismus. After the war he worked at GCHQ until the mid-1970s.

== Early life ==
Albert Leslie Yoxall was born on 18 May 1914 in Salford, and was the youngest out of four brothers. His father died young in a tramway accident. Leslie Yoxall was educated at Manchester Grammar School from 1925 and Sidney Sussex College, Cambridge from 1933, graduating with first-class honours. He received his doctorate in 1941.

On the outbreak of war, Yoxall returned to teach at Manchester Grammar School, and was next in line to become the head of mathematics.

== Codebreaking at Bletchley Park ==
In April 1941, Gordon Welchman wrote to Yoxall advising him that he would soon be asked to help with "war work". In due course, Yoxall was invited to join Bletchley Park and was, alongside Bill Tutte, interviewed by Hugh Alexander and then Alan Turing. Yoxall was selected to join the team in Hut 8, working on Naval Enigma as a "temporary junior administrative officer". He worked on the problem of Offizier (Officer) messages, which had been enciphered on Enigma with a second setting for additional security. Yoxall discovered what became known as "Yoxallismus", a method for recovering the Offizier setting.

In October/November 1942, he moved to Hut 7 to work on a Japanese naval cipher, making a significant contribution in identifying how the cipher permutations were constructed.

== Post-war work ==
After the war he moved to Eastcote and then moved again with GCHQ to Cheltenham in 1953. He worked in Washington as a liaison officer from 1959 to 1963, and returned again in 1968 to 1972. After the first tour in the US, a letter sent to the director of GCHQ (Clive Loehnis) stated that "his superior technical competence and analytic insight have served as a stimulus to everyone with whom he came into contact. His engaging personality, diplomacy and tact have endeared him to us all".

He retired from GCHQ around 1974 and returned to teaching, tutoring and coaching students in mathematics.

== Personal life and death ==
In 1949, Yoxall married Doris Gibson. She died in 2002.

Yoxall died on 30 September 2005, at the age of 91.
