= Eric Nave =

Australian cryptographer

Theodore Eric Nave
- Born: 18 March 1899; Croydon, Adelaide, South Australia
- Died: 23 June 1993 (aged 94); Mooloolaba, Queensland
- Military career
- Allegiance: Australia
- Branch: Royal Australian Navy; Royal Navy
- Service years: 1916–1947
- Rank: Captain
- Conflicts: World War I World War II
- Awards: Officer of the Order of the British Empire
- Other work: Cryptanalyst, intelligence officer

Captain Eric Nave OBE (18 March 1899 – 23 June 1993) was an Australian cryptographer and intelligence officer in the Royal Australian Navy (RAN) and Royal Navy, noted for his work with joint Allied intelligence units during World War II. He served in the navy from 1916 to 1949, then served as an officer in the Australian Security Intelligence Organisation until 1959.

== Early life and background ==
Nave was born in Croydon, Adelaide, the son of Thomas Henry Theodore Nave and Ethel Sophie (née Peterson). His father worked for South Australian Railways (SAR), serving as chief clerk in the office of the Comptroller of Accounts. Thomas was also a long-standing member of the Adelaide Repertory Theatre, initially as an actor and producer, then as business manager, acting secretary, and chairman. He was subsequently made a Member of the Order of the British Empire in the 1948 Birthday Honours for his "services in cultural life of Adelaide".

Eric Nave began working for South Australian Railways as an office boy in his father's office on 8 December 1913, after graduating from Hindmarsh District High School, having received the Junior Certificate, passing the required five subjects, gaining credits in English history and arithmetic. He took the Civil Service Examination in early December 1914, but came 22nd out of 26 in his group. He remained with SAR, and was appointed a junior clerk on 17 May 1915.

== Royal Australian Navy service ==
On 1 February 1917 Nave joined the Royal Australian Navy, and was posted to HMAS Cerberus the RAN training establishment south of Melbourne, where on 1 March, he was appointed a paymasters' clerk on probation. He served aboard the second-class protected cruiser HMAS Encounter from April 1917 to October 1918, being confirmed in his rank in May.

From 6 October 1918 to 4 July 1919 he was stationed aboard the training ship HMAS Tingira at Rose Bay, Sydney, then from 5 July 1919 to 30 September 1920 aboard the battlecruiser HMAS Australia, where he was promoted from paymaster midshipman to paymaster sub-lieutenant on 1 March 1920, with seniority from 1 February 1919. From 1 October 1920 to 17 January 1921 he was posted to HMAS Penguin, a depot ship at Sydney.

Nave needed to be proficient in a foreign language to gain further promotion. He chose Japanese because "extra pay of 6d per day was paid to those qualified in French or German, but those proficient in Japanese received 5/0d" – five shillings, i.e. ten times the rate for French or German. He was based in Japan from February 1921 to April 1923, and was then examined by the officials of the British Embassy in Tokyo and awarded the highest pass mark (91%) ever recorded by them, also receiving promotion to paymaster lieutenant on 1 September 1921. He returned to service at sea aboard HMAS Brisbane from April 1923 to January 1924, and was then attached to the staff of the Rear Admiral Commanding HM Australian Fleet.

== Royal Navy service ==
In August 1925 Nave "loaned" to the British Royal Navy. He was sent to Hong Kong and posted to the heavy cruiser HMS Hawkins. Nave expected to be employed as an interpreter, but instead was presented with intercepted coded Japanese naval signals and ordered by the Commander-in-Chief, China, to break them. Within two months Nave had not only broken the code, but had also worked out the Imperial Japanese Navy's radio protocols and relay system, and the organisation of their various commands. He also broke another code before his period of loan service was completed in October 1927.

The loan was promptly renewed in December 1927 and Nave was assigned to the Japanese desk in the Government Code and Cypher School in England. There he broke the code of the Japanese naval attaché, which meant that during London Naval Conference of 1930, the Admiralty were fully aware of the Japanese negotiating position, and also the Japanese Navy's strategy for fighting a war with the United States. Nave had been promoted to paymaster lieutenant-commander on 1 September 1929, and on 29 August 1930 "in view of his exceptional qualifications and experience in certain specialist duties" he was transferred to the Royal Navy. This required an Order in Council from the Privy Council because of the different systems of pay and pensions in the two services. Nave was the first officer to be transferred from the Royal Australian Navy to the Royal Navy.

Nave's codebreaking career continued, serving in the China Fleet and in London. He was promoted to paymaster commander on 30 June 1937, and assigned to the code-breaking unit of the Far East Combined Bureau (FECB), a tri-service intelligence organisation based in Hong Kong. There his team successfully broke a series of Japanese naval codes until the introduction in early 1939 of "Naval Code D", designated by the US Navy "JN-25". By early December 1939, FECB had been relocated to Singapore, and the code was beginning to relinquish some of its secrets.

However, the pressure of work had begun to take its toll on Nave's health, and in early 1940 he was diagnosed as suffering from tropical sprue, and was sent back to Australia to recuperate. Sick, and with a "heavily pregnant" wife, he did not want to return to Singapore. On medical advice Nave did not return to the tropics instead setting up a small RAN cryptographic unit in Victoria Barracks, Melbourne. The unit had a core of naval personnel, with a number of university academics and graduates specialising in classics, linguistics and mathematics, e.g. Athanasius Treweek and Arthur Dale Trendall. In May 1941 Nave's unit was combined with personnel from the Australian Army and designated the Special Intelligence Bureau (SIB). They had some successes, reading Japanese diplomatic traffic from South America, and also breaking JN-4, the operational code for submarines.

In early 1942 SIB became part of the "Fleet Radio Unit, Melbourne", (FRUMEL), an "inter-naval" (joint American-Australian-British) cryptographic unit, and moved to the "Monterey" apartment building in Queens Road. FRUMEL was commanded by USN Lieutenant Rudolph Fabian, formerly of Station CAST in the Philippines. Despite continued success (Nave had warned, a month before it happened, that the Australian base at Milne Bay, at the eastern tip of New Guinea, was to be invaded in late August 1942, so the base was reinforced, and the subsequent Battle of Milne Bay was decisively won by U.S. and Australian forces – the first time the Japanese had been defeated on land by the Allies) Nave was reportedly forced out of FRUMEL and "Monterey" by Fabian, who apparently regarded him as a "security risk", because Nave wanted to cooperate with the "inter-army" unit, the Central Bureau, based at Brisbane. According to his staff, Nave often kept keys to new codes passed on by the Americans and British to himself, which might have been acceptable as a training exercise in peacetime, but not in time of war. Treweek said: "We always looked forward to his day off. We'd get the keys to his safe and find all this material in there." Nave also had difficulties with his superior, Commander Rupert B. M. Long, the Director of Naval Intelligence, whom he considered a man of no great ability.

Nave subsequently joined Central Bureau in early 1943. Joe Richard, a Central Bureau veteran, said later that "[i]f Fabian did not want Nave, the U.S. Army codebreakers were very happy to have him ... Fabian's dislike of Eric Nave was very fortunate for us. Nave became an indispensable person" in "reading air-to-ground messages containing the weather" which "gave away the intended target for the day." Nave also created a system of field units to intercept operational messages and advise field commanders of Japanese movements and intentions, a model of successful integration of intelligence with operations. Nave was promoted to the acting rank of captain on 12 October 1944. When Central Bureau moved forward to the Philippines in 1945, Nave was left behind to write the unit's official history and to close down the organisation in Brisbane.

== Post-war career ==
Nave was loaned back to the Royal Australian Navy from 1 January 1948 until 17 March 1949, when he retired from the Royal Navy.

Nave joined the newly-formed Australian Security Intelligence Organisation, as Senior "C" officer on 20 October 1949, with identity card No. 000113. On 19 October 1950 he was appointed Assistant Director "C" Branch, investigation & research, and on 1 October 1957 became the Regional Director for Victoria, until eventually retiring on 18 March 1959.

Nave was eventually recognised for his work by being appointed an Officer of the Order of the British Empire in the 1972 New Year Honours.

== Personal life ==
Nave had four children with his first wife, Helene Elizabeth Ray. He married his second wife, Margaret McLeish Richardson, in 1972.

== Publications ==
Nave co-authored a book with James Rusbridger, which was to have been published in 1988. However, the book was withdrawn after pressure from the D-Notice Committee. It was eventually published in 1991 as Betrayal at Pearl Harbor, but received a highly critical reception from the intelligence establishment. The book apparently reflects Rusbridger's views rather than those of Nave, particularly the claim that Winston Churchill deliberately did not pass on warnings about the attack on Pearl Harbor, in order to get the United States involved the war. According to British historian Peter Elphick, in a 1991 interview on Japanese television, Nave "repudiated a large slice of what Rusbridger had written, calling it speculation". Dufty said that the Allies had "solved" the JN-25 code as they knew how it worked; with five numbers, an additive book and an indicator system. But they had not "broken" the code by having enough code words and indicators to read a message. American military historian Stephen E. Ambrose pointed out that the claim "makes no sense at all", since if Churchill "knew the attack was coming, he certainly would have wanted the United States Navy to meet and defeat it – after all, the United States would be fully into the war the moment the battle began."

== Bibliography ==
- Boettcher, Brian (2009). Eleven Bloody Days: The battle for Milne Bay. Sydney, NSW: Brian Boettcher. ISBN 978-0-646-50682-1.
- Dufty, David (2017). The secret code-breakers of Central Bureau : how Australia's signals-intelligence network helped win the Pacific War. ISBN 978-1-925548-19-8. OCLC 991856162.
- Elphick, Peter (1997). Far Eastern File: The Intelligence War in the Far East 1930-1945. London, UK: Hodder & Stoughton. ISBN 0-340-66584-X.
- Jenkins, David (1992). Battle Surface: Japan's Submarine War Against Australia 1942-44. NSW, Australia: Random House. ISBN 0-09-182638-1.
- Kornicki, Peter (2021). Eavesdropping on the Emperor: Interrogators and Codebreakers in Britain's War with Japan. London: Hurst & Co. ISBN 9781787384729.
- Pfennigwerth, Ian (2006). A Man of Intelligence: the life of Captain Theodore Eric Nave, Australian codebreaker extraordinary. Dural, New South Wales: Rosenberg Publishing. ISBN 1-877058-41-6.
- Rusbridger, James; Nave, Eric (1991). Betrayal at Pearl Harbor: how Churchill lured Roosevelt into War. London, UK: O'Mara. ISBN 1-85479-162-1.
- Smith, Michael (2000). The Emperor's Codes: Bletchley Park and the breaking of Japan's secret ciphers. London, UK: Bantam. ISBN 0-593-04642-0.
