= Alastair Denniston =

Scottish cryptographer (1881–1961)

Alastair Denniston CB CMG CBE RNVR
- Alastair Denniston in 1926
- Born: Alexander Guthrie Denniston; 1 December 1881; Greenock, Renfrewshire, Scotland
- Died: 1 January 1961 (aged 79); Lymington, Hampshire, England
- Education: University of Bonn; University of Paris
- Spouse: Dorothy Mary Gilliat (m. 1917)
- Children: 2, including Robin
- Scientific career
- Fields: Cryptologist
- Workplaces: Admiralty (Room 40); Government Code and Cypher School; Government Communications Headquarters

Commander Alexander Guthrie Denniston (1 December 1881 – 1 January 1961) was a Scottish codebreaker, deputy head of the Government Code and Cypher School (GC&CS) and hockey player. Denniston was appointed operational head of GC&CS in 1919 and remained so until February 1942.

== Early life ==
Alastair Denniston
Sport
- Sport: Field hockey
- Position: Defender
Senior career
Years	Team	Caps	Goals
1906	Bowdon	-	-
1908	Edinburgh	-	-
1911	Royal Naval College Osborne	-	-
National team
Years	Team	Caps	Goals
–	Scotland		-
Medal record
Men's field hockey
Representing Great Britain
Bronze medal – third place	1908 London	Team competition

Denniston was born in Greenock, Renfrewshire, the son of a medical practitioner. He studied at the University of Bonn and the University of Paris. Denniston was a member of the Scottish Olympic hockey team in 1908 and won a bronze medal. He played as a half-back, and his club team was listed as Edinburgh. In the IOC's official 1908 report, he is listed as "Dennistoun" rather than Denniston.

== First World War and after ==
In 1914, Denniston helped form Room 40 in the Admiralty, an organisation responsible for intercepting and decrypting enemy messages. In 1917, he married a fellow Room 40 worker, Dorothy Mary Gilliat.

After the First World War, Denniston, recognising the strategic importance of codebreaking, kept the Room 40 activity functioning. Room 40 was merged with its counterpart in the Army, MI1b in 1919, renamed the Government Code and Cypher School (GC&CS) in 1920 and transferred from the Navy to the Foreign Office. Denniston was chosen to run the new organisation.

With the rise of Hitler, Denniston began making preparations. Following the practice of his superiors at Room 40, he contacted scientists from Oxford and Cambridge (including Alan Turing and Gordon Welchman), asking if they would be willing to serve if war broke out. Bletchley Park was chosen by MI6 chief Admiral Hugh Sinclair as the location for the codebreaking effort because it was at a rail junction on the west coast main line 47 miles (76 km) north of London with good rail connections to Oxford and Cambridge. Sinclair acquired the Bletchley Park property, and Denniston was assigned to prepare the site and design the huts to be built on the grounds. The GC&CS moved to the new location in August 1939, just before the invasion of Poland and the start of the Second World War. Its name changed to Government Communications Headquarters (GCHQ).

On 26 July 1939, five weeks before the outbreak of war, Denniston was one of three Britons (along with Dilly Knox and Humphrey Sandwith) who participated in the trilateral Polish-French-British conference held in the Kabaty Woods south of Warsaw, at which the Polish Biuro Szyfrów (Cipher Bureau) initiated the French and British into the decryption of German military Enigma ciphers.

== Second World War ==
Denniston remained in command until he was admitted to hospital in June 1940 for a bladder stone. Although ill, he flew to the United States in 1941 to make contact with American cryptographers including William Friedman. Denniston returned to Bletchley Park for a while but moved to London later in 1941 to work on diplomatic traffic.

Despite his knowledge of the success of Polish cryptologists against Enigma, Denniston shared the general pessimism about the prospects of breaking the more complex Naval Enigma encryption until as late as the summer of 1940, having allegedly told the Head of Naval Section at Bletchley: "You know, the Germans don't mean you to read their stuff, and I don't expect you ever will." The advent of Banburismus shortly afterwards showed his pessimism to be misplaced.

In October 1941, the originator of the technique, Alan Turing, along with fellow senior cryptologists Gordon Welchman, Stuart Milner-Barry and Hugh Alexander wrote to Churchill, over the head of Denniston, to alert Churchill to the fact that a shortage of staff at Bletchley Park was preventing them from deciphering many messages. An addition of personnel, small by military standards, could make a big difference to the effectiveness of the fighting effort. The slow response to previous requests had convinced them that the strategic value of their work was not understood in the right quarters. In the letter, there was praise for the 'energy and foresight' of Commander Edward Travis.

Churchill reacted to the letter immediately, ordering "Action this day". Resources were transferred as fast as possible.

In February 1942, GC&CS was reorganised. Travis, Denniston's second in command and chief of the Naval section, succeeded Denniston at Bletchley Park, overseeing the work on military codes and ciphers. When Travis took over, he "presided over an administrative revolution which at last brought the management of Intelligence into line with its mode of production".

== Personal and postwar life ==
Denniston and his wife had two children: a son and daughter. Their son, Robin, was educated at Westminster School and Christ Church, Oxford. After Denniston's demotion and resulting decreased income, Robin's school fees were paid by benefactors. However, the Dennistons' daughter had to leave her school due to lack of funds.

Denniston retired in 1945, and later taught French and Latin in Leatherhead.

William Friedman, the American cryptographer who broke the Japanese Purple code, later wrote to Denniston's daughter: "Your father was a great man in whose debt all English-speaking people will remain for a very long time, if not forever. That so few should know exactly what he did ... is the sad part."

Robin Denniston became a publisher. In 2007, he published Thirty Secret Years, a biography of his father that consolidated his reputation in GCHQ history.

== Honours and awards ==
- 7 January 1918 appointed an Officer of the Order of the British Empire (OBE) Commander Alexander Guthrie Denniston, R.N.V.R. Naval Intelligence Division, Admiralty.
- 2 January 1933 appointed a Commander of the Order of the British Empire (CBE) Commander Alexander Guthrie Denniston, O.B.E., R.N.V.R. Head of a Department, Foreign Office.
- 12 June 1941 appointed a Companion of the Order of St Michael and St George (CMG) Commander Alexander Guthrie Denniston, C.B.E., R.N.V.R. (Retd.), Head of a Department of the Foreign Office.

Ribbon	Description	Notes
	Order of the British Empire (OBE)	Appointed Officer 7 January 1918; Appointed Commander 2 January 1933
	1914–15 Star	WWI 1914-1918
	British War Medal	WWI 1914-1918
	Victory Medal (United Kingdom)	WWI 1914-1918
	Order of St Michael and St George (CMG)	Appointed Companion 12 June 1941

== Fictional depictions ==
In the 2014 film The Imitation Game, he is portrayed by Charles Dance.

Government offices
New title	Deputy Director of the Government Code and Cypher School later Deputy Director (Diplomatic and Commercial); 1919–1945	Succeeded by Sir Edward Travis
