= Hugh Foss =

British cryptographer (1902–1971)

Hugh Rose Foss OBE (13 May 1902 – 23 December 1971) was a British cryptanalyst. At Bletchley Park during World War II he made significant contributions both to the breaking of the German Enigma code and headed the section tasked with breaking Japanese Naval codes.

== Early life and education ==
Foss was born in Kobe, Japan, the son of the Rt Revd Hugh Foss, Bishop of Osaka and his second wife Janet Ovans. As a child of a missionary family stationed in Japan he developed fluency in Japanese from an early age.

Foss was later educated at Marlborough College and graduated from Christ's College, Cambridge in 1924.

== Career as a cryptanalyst ==
In December 1924 he joined the Government Code and Cypher School. He recalled learning of two models of the Enigma machine in 1926: the large non-reciprocal typing B model, and the small index C model. In 1927 Edward Travis gave him a small (reciprocal) machine to examine, and he wrote a paper, "The Reciprocal Enigma", on solving the non-plugboard Enigma. The small [C Model] Enigma was developed by the German services; the standard World War II British Typex machine was also developed from it. In September 1934 Foss and Oliver Strachey broke the Japanese naval attaché cipher. In November 1940 he was the first person to break a day's worth of the German Enigma code, deciphering 8 May 1940 by the method of Banburismus. In honour of this feat, 8 May is referred to as "Foss's Day". Foss was made an officer of the Most Excellent Order of the British Empire on 1 January 1942.

At Bletchley Park in World War II, Foss headed the Japanese Naval Section (Hut 7) from 1942 to 1943. In December 1944 he went to Washington and worked with U.S. Navy cryptographers on Japanese ciphers. A sandal-wearer, he was known as "Lend-lease Jesus". Gordon Welchman was told that Foss was highly esteemed by the Americans, and says that "before the war he was one of the most brilliant of the professional cryptographers of the Government Code and Cypher School".

Foss' paper "Reminiscences on Enigma", written in 1949, is included as chapter 3 in Action this Day.

== Deviser of Scottish country dances ==
While working as a cryptanalyst, one of his major off-duty recreational activities was Scottish country dancing. Having become an outstanding dancer himself, Foss devised many new Scottish country dances, including Fugal Fergus, John McAlpin, Polharrow Burn and The Wee Cooper o'Fife. He published several volumes of these from his own imprint, Glendarroch Press. Foss was elected a Fellow of the Royal Society of Arts on 11 January 1954.

== Family and later life ==
Foss had four siblings. His elder half-brother Charles Calveley Foss was awarded the Victoria Cross in the First World War.

In April 1932, Foss married Alison Graham. They had two children.

Foss retired from GCHQ in 1953 to live at Glendarroch in St. John's Town of Dalry, Kirkcudbrightshire, Scotland. He died there in 1971 and is buried with his wife Alison in Dalry Kirkyard.

== Sources ==
- Dictionary of National Biography
- Erskine, Ralph; Smith, Michael, eds. (2011), The Bletchley Park Codebreakers, Biteback Publishing Ltd, ISBN 978-1-84954-078-0 Updated and extended version of Action This Day: From Breaking of the Enigma Code to the Birth of the Modern Computer Bantam Press 2001
- Welchman, Gordon (1997) [1982], The Hut Six story: Breaking the Enigma codes, Cleobury Mortimer, England: M&M Baldwin, ISBN 978-0-947712-34-1 New edition updated with an addendum consisting of a 1986 paper written by Welchman that corrects his misapprehensions in the 1982 edition.
