= Government Code and Cypher School =

Former British intelligence agency

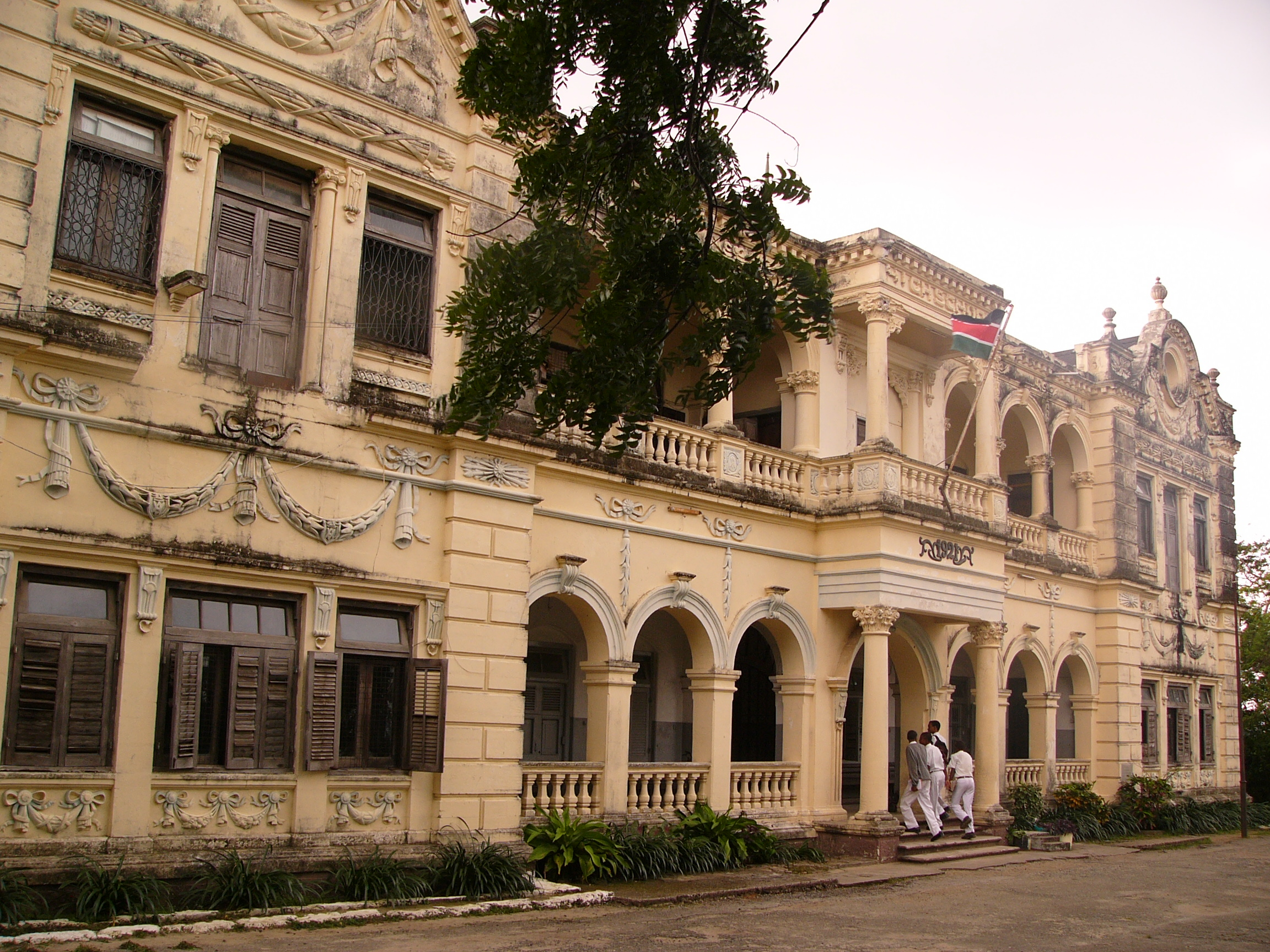
Allidina Visram school in Mombasa, pictured above in 2006, was the location of the British "Kilindini" codebreaking outpost during World War II.

The Government Code and Cypher School (GC&CS) was a British signals intelligence agency set up in 1919. During the First World War, the British Army and Royal Navy had separate signals intelligence agencies, MI1b and NID25 (initially known as Room 40) respectively. It was particularly known for its work on codebreaking at Bletchley Park and after the war became the Government Communications Headquarters (GCHQ).

== Interwar period ==
In 1919, the Cabinet's Secret Service Committee, chaired by Lord Curzon, recommended that a peacetime codebreaking agency should be created, a task which was given to the Director of Naval Intelligence, Hugh Sinclair. Sinclair merged staff from NID25 and MI1b into the new organisation, which initially consisted of around 25–30 officers and a similar number of clerical staff. It was titled the "Government Code and Cypher School" (GC&CS), a cover-name which was chosen by Courtenay Forbes of the Foreign Office. Alastair Denniston, who had been a member of NID25, was appointed as its operational head. It was initially under the control of the Admiralty and located in Watergate House, York Buildings, Adelphi, London. Its public function was "to advise as to the security of codes and cyphers used by all Government departments and to assist in their provision", but also had a secret directive to "study the methods of cypher communications used by foreign powers". GC&CS officially formed on 1 November 1919, and produced its first decrypt prior to that date, on 19 October.

Before the Second World War, GC&CS was a relatively small department. By 1922, the main focus of GC&CS was on diplomatic traffic, with "no service traffic ever worth circulating" and so, at the initiative of Lord Curzon, it was transferred from the Admiralty to the Foreign Office. GC&CS came under the supervision of Hugh Sinclair, who by 1923 was both the Chief of SIS and Director of GC&CS. In 1925, both organisations were co-located on different floors of Broadway Buildings, opposite St James's Park. Messages decrypted by GC&CS were distributed in blue-jacketed files that became known as "BJs". In the 1920s, GC&CS was successfully reading Soviet Union diplomatic cyphers. However, in May 1927, during a row over clandestine Soviet support for the General Strike and the distribution of subversive propaganda, Prime Minister Stanley Baldwin made details from the decrypts public.

== World War II ==
During the Second World War, GC&CS was based largely at Bletchley Park, in present-day Milton Keynes, working on understanding the German Enigma machine and Lorenz ciphers. In 1940, GC&CS was working on the diplomatic codes and ciphers of 26 countries, tackling over 150 diplomatic cryptosystems. Senior staff included Alastair Denniston, Oliver Strachey, Dilly Knox, John Tiltman, Edward Travis, Ernst Fetterlein, Josh Cooper, Donald Michie, Alan Turing, Gordon Welchman, Joan Clarke, Max Newman, William Tutte, I. J. (Jack) Good, Peter Calvocoressi and Hugh Foss. The 1943 British–US Communication Intelligence Agreement, BRUSA, connected the signal intercept networks of the GC&CS and the US National Security Agency (NSA). Equipment used to break enemy codes included the Colossus computer. Colossus consisted of ten networked computers.

An outstation in the Far East, the Far East Combined Bureau, was set up in Hong Kong in 1935 and moved to Singapore in 1939. Subsequently, with the Japanese advance down the Malay Peninsula, the Army and RAF codebreakers went to the Wireless Experimental Centre in Delhi, India. The Navy codebreakers in FECB went to Colombo, Ceylon, then to Kilindini, near Mombasa, Kenya.

== GCHQ ==
GC&CS was renamed the Government Communications Headquarters (GCHQ) in June 1946.

The organisation was at first based in Eastcote in northwest London, then in 1951 moved to the outskirts of Cheltenham. One of the major reasons for selecting Cheltenham was that the town had been the location of the headquarters of the United States Army Services of Supply for the European Theater during the War, which built up a telecommunications infrastructure in the region to carry out its logistics tasks.

== Sources ==
- Aldrich, Richard J. (2010). GCHQ: The Uncensored Story of Britain's Most Secret Intelligence Agency. HarperCollins. ISBN 978-0-00-727847-3.
- Johnson, John (1997). The Evolution of British Sigint 1653–1939. Cheltenham: HMSO.
- Kahn, David (1991). Seizing the Enigma: The Race to Break the German U-Boat Codes, 1939–1943. Houghton Mifflin. ISBN 978-0395427392.
- Smith, Michael (2001) [1999]. "An Undervalued Effort: how the British broke Japan's Codes". In Smith, Michael; Erskine, Ralph (eds.). Action this Day. London: Bantam. ISBN 978-0-593-04910-5.
