= World War II cryptography =

Military code use and breaking during the Second World War

Cryptography was used extensively during World War II because of the importance of radio communication and the ease of radio interception. The nations involved fielded a plethora of code and cipher systems, many of the latter using rotor machines. As a result, the theoretical and practical aspects of cryptanalysis, or codebreaking, were much advanced. Most of the codes used in the war were eventually broken by the enemy, with consequences ranging from trivial to crucial.

Possibly the most important codebreaking event of the war was the successful decryption by the Allies of the German "Enigma" cipher. The first break into Enigma was accomplished by Polish Cipher Bureau around 1932; the techniques and insights used were passed to the French and British Allies just before the outbreak of the war in 1939. They were substantially improved by British efforts at Bletchley Park during the war. Decryption of the Enigma cipher allowed the Allies to read important parts of German radio traffic on important networks and was an invaluable source of military intelligence throughout the war. Intelligence from this source and other high level sources, such as cryptanalysis of the Lorenz cipher, was eventually called Ultra.

A similar break into the most secure Japanese diplomatic cipher, designated Purple by the US Army Signals Intelligence Service, started before the US entered the war. Product from this source was called Magic.

On the other side, German code breaking in World War II achieved some notable successes cracking British naval and other ciphers.

== Australia ==
- Central Bureau
- FRUMEL: Fleet Radio Unit, Melbourne
- Secret Intelligence Australia

== Finland ==
- Finnish Defence Intelligence Agency

== France ==
- PC Bruno
- Hans-Thilo Schmidt

== Germany ==
- Enigma machine
- Fish (cryptography) British codename for German teleprinter ciphers
  - Lorenz cipher a Fish cipher codenamed Tunny by the British
  - Siemens and Halske T52 Geheimfernschreiber, a Fish cipher codenamed Sturgeon by the British
- Short Weather Cipher
- B-Dienst
- Reservehandverfahren
- OKW/CHI
- Gisbert Hasenjaeger

== Italy ==
- Hagelin machine
- Enigma machine

== Japan ==
- Japanese army and diplomatic codes
- Japanese naval codes
- PURPLE
- JN-25

== Poland ==
- Cryptanalysis of the Enigma
- Biuro Szyfrów (Cipher Bureau)
- Marian Rejewski
- Jerzy Różycki
- Henryk Zygalski
- bomba
- Lacida Machine

== Soviet Union ==
- 5th Department of NKVD (1941-1943), 5th Department of NKGB (1943-1945)
  - Lieutenant general Ivan Shevelyov, the head of the department
- 8th Department of Red Army General Staff
  - Lieutenant general Piotr Belyusov, the head of the department

== Sweden ==
- Arne Beurling

== United Kingdom ==
- Bletchley Park
- Cryptanalysis of the Enigma
- Cryptanalysis of the Lorenz cipher
- Far East Combined Bureau (FECB)
- Naval Intelligence Division (NID)
- Wireless Experimental Centre (WEC)
- Bombe
- Colossus computer
- Typex
- SYKO
- Ultra
- Alan Turing
- W. T. Tutte
- John Tiltman
- Max Newman
- Tommy Flowers
- I. J. Good
- John Herivel
- Leo Marks
- Gordon Welchman
- Poem code

== United States ==
- Magic (cryptography)
- Signals Intelligence Service US Army, see also Arlington Hall
- OP-20-G US Navy Signals Intelligence group
- Elizebeth Smith Friedman
- William Friedman
- Frank Rowlett
- Abraham Sinkov
- Genevieve Grotjan Feinstein
- Leo Rosen
- Joseph Rochefort, leader of the effort to crack Japanese Naval codes
- Joseph Mauborgne
- Agnes Meyer Driscoll
- SIGABA cipher machine
- SIGSALY voice encryption
- SIGTOT one-time tape system
- M-209 cipher machine
- Station HYPO cryptanalysis group
- Station CAST cryptanalysis group
- Station NEGAT

== See also ==
- Cryptography
- History of cryptography
- World War I cryptography
- Ultra (cryptography)
- Magic (cryptography)
- Cryptanalysis of the Enigma
- Bombe
- Enigma (machine)
- SIGABA
- TypeX
- Lorenz cipher
- Geheimfernschreiber
- Codetalkers
- PURPLE
- SIGSALY
- JN-25
- Bletchley Park
- Biuro Szyfrów
- PC Bruno
- SIS US Army, later moved to Arlington Hall
- OP-20-G US Navy
- Marian Rejewski
- Jerzy Różycki
- Henryk Zygalski
- Alan Turing
- W. T. Tutte
- John Tiltman
- Max Newman
- Tommy Flowers
- I. J. Good
- William Friedman
- Frank Rowlett
- Abraham Sinkov
- Joseph Rochefort
- Agnes Meyer Driscoll
- Hans-Thilo Schmidt
