= Sinkov =

Sinkov may refer to:

- Abraham Sinkov, an American cryptanalyst
- Sinkov, Ukraine, a settlement in Ternopil Oblast, Ukraine
- Anatoli Sinkov (artillerist), Hero of the Soviet Union (1945)
- Anatoli Sinkov (pilot), Hero of the Soviet Union (1944), later stripped of the award
