= No. 1 Wireless Unit RAAF =

No. 1 Wireless Unit RAAF was an Australian signals intelligence unit of World War II. The Unit was established on 25 April 1942.

This name which was the formalised name given to the small RAAF Intercept Station operating in two back-to-back houses at 21 Sycamore Street and 24 French Street in the suburb of Pimlico in Townsville established by Wing Commander Booth in March 1942.

1 Wireless unit became part of the larger Central Bureau established under Macarthur and comprised 7 RAAF, 1 AMF and 4 United States Army personnel in No. 1 Wireless Unit at Townsville. Flight Lieutenant Blakely was the first Commanding Officer. He was assisted by Captain H. Brown, US Army, and four US Air Force sergeants who were experienced in Sigint and who had escaped to Australia from the Philippines.

== History ==
The first seven RAAF personnel to be trained as part of No. 1 Wireless Unit in a "special intelligence" course were trained at Victoria Barracks in Melbourne in July 1941. They were the first personnel in No. 1 Wireless Unit which was to be involved in the interception of Japanese Naval and military traffic. They were all qualified radio operators and extremely proficient in international Morse code.

The six members of the unit who completed training were sent to Darwin. They set up two intercept radios (Kingsley AR7's on the top floor of the "Camera Obscura" building at the RAAF Darwin airfield. They worked in continuous 4-hour shifts intercepting Japanese naval "point to point" and "aircraft to ground" traffic from Japanese at the following locations:-

- Palau
- Saipan (Marianas)
- Tokyo
- Truk (Caroline Islands)

Their intercepts were sent to the navy cryptology section in Melbourne via RAAF Signals Darwin. They enciphered their messages to Melbourne in a secret cipher before passing them over to the RAAF Signals personnel. This ensured that their intercepts of Japanese Kana code or encoded messages were not apparent to other military personnel to protect the secrecy of their intercept operation.

In the meantime, the RAAF began to establish their own small administrative and intelligence group in Melbourne. H. Roy Booth was in charge of this new group. Their task was to start to learn how to process the intercept information sent from Darwin.

The RAAF Kana operators in Darwin intercepted many important transmissions leading up to the attack on Pearl Harbor. The Darwin intercept group was reduced to four due to illness.

== Darwin bombing ==
The early morning shift detected abnormal traffic on the morning of 19 February 1942 from Kendari in the Southern Celebes and between aircraft and possible aircraft carriers. The abnormal traffic was passed on to Group Captain Scherger, the Commanding Officer of RAAF Darwin.

Unfortunately no precautions were taken at Darwin on that fateful day. 188 carrier-based aircraft attacked Darwin in the first raid followed by 54 land based bombers in the second raid. There were 243 killed and about 350 injured on this tragic day.

Orders were sent from Melbourne for the four healthy Kana operators in Darwin to disperse to civilian radio stations across the northern parts of Australia as follows:-.

- "Snow" Bradshaw – Wyndham, WA
- Alf Towers – Broome, WA
- G. "Taff" Davis – Groote Eyelandt, NT
- "Clarrie" Hermes – Groote Eyelandt, NT

Snow Bradshaw was evacuated to Wyndham in Western Australia on board a De Havilland Rapide. The Rapide was attacked while landing at Wyndham airfield by a flight of Japanese Zeros during the first enemy air raid on the town on 3 March 1942.

The crew and passengers abandoned the Rapide, which trundled along the runway on fire. It stopped at the end of the runway where it burnt itself out. A group of nine "Betty" bombers then bombed the Wyndham airfield leaving a number of large mud holes in the runway.

Alf Towers was slightly luckier than Snow Bradshaw. He had departed Wyndham airfield just prior to the Japanese air raid in a Lockheed 10A piloted by Jimmy Wood. They landed at Broome in Western Australia about 30 minutes after a very large Japanese bombing raid on the town in which at least 70 people were killed.

The use of the civilian radios proved totally unsuccessful as the Kana operators could only use the radio receivers when not being used by the civil air radio service. This meant it was impossible to keep a constant watch on Japanese activities.

== Pimlico and the South Pacific ==
Map of Pimlico houses

Then on 7 March 1942, a top secret small RAAF Intercept Station was set up in 2 houses at Pimlico in Townsville under Wing Commander Booth. The two houses backed on to each other, one being at 21 Sycamore Street, Pimlico and the other being at 24 French Street, Pimlico. Operators based in these houses would intercept Japanese wireless signals and break the Japanese KANA code. Radio equipment was installed in No. 24 French Street.

On 25 April 1942 this small RAAF Unit was given its new name of No. 1 Wireless Unit and then became part of General Douglas MacArthur's new joint American-Australian Sigint organisation called Central Bureau in Ascot, Brisbane. Under some American pressure on the RAAF No 1 WU accompanied the American forces, going to Port Moresby in 1943, and Lae Nadzab Airport, Owi & Biak in 1944 (they were the only Australians on Biak). The WU could give up to 3 hours warning of Japanese air raids. Bleakley then went with No 5 WU to the Philippines in 1945.
