= Frank Byron Rowlett Award =

The Frank Byron Rowlett Award (formerly the Information Systems Security National Award) is an award given by the National Security Agency to recognize outstanding organizational and individual excellence in the field of information systems security. Today these annual awards, named in honor of cryptologic pioneer Frank Rowlett, recognize significant contributions to the information assurance discipline.

The Frank B. Rowlett Awards recognize individual and organization one-time or long-term achievement in the improvement of national information systems security, information assurance readiness, or defensive information operations.

The Frank B. Rowlett Trophy for Organizational Achievement is awarded annually to the U.S. Government organization recognized as making the most significant contribution to the improvement of national information systems security, operational information assurance readiness, or the defensive information operations posture of the United States.

The Frank B. Rowlett Trophy for Individual Achievement is awarded annually to the individual, within a U.S. Government organization, making the most significant contribution to improving his/her element's information systems security posture, information assurance readiness or the conduct of defensive information operations.

== See also ==
- the National Computer Systems Security Award, granted by the US National Institute of Standards and Technology and the NSA (for a time by the NSA's National Computer Security Center (NCSC)) most years between 1988 and 2010
- List of computer-related awards
