= Japanese army and diplomatic codes =

Ciphers and codes used up to and during World War II

Japanese army and diplomatic codes. This article is on Japanese army and diplomatic ciphers and codes used up to and during World War II, to supplement the article on Japanese naval codes. The diplomatic codes were significant militarily, particularly those from diplomats in Germany.

Japanese army (IJA) and diplomatic codes were studied at Arlington Hall (US), Bletchley Park (UK), Central Bureau or CBB (Australian, US; in Melbourne, then Brisbane), the FECB (British Far East Combined Bureau) at Hong Kong, Singapore, Kilindi then Colombo and the British Wireless Experimental Centre in Delhi.

== Japanese Army codes and ciphers ==
Arlington Hall had initially delayed study of the Army codes until 1942 because of the "high payoff" from diplomatic codes, but were not successful until 1943. Then, with success on Army codes in April, the increasing workload was put under Solomon Kullback in branch B-II in September. Other mainly diplomatic work was put under Frank Rowlett in B-III. Branch B-I translated Japanese.

Initially, "brute-force" IBM runs on Army codes from April 1942 to the end of the year did not work. but U.S. Army Sgt. Joe Richard noticed that the system for 2468 changed every three weeks, so the messages could be arranged by IBM tabulators by group and time period. Richard was assisted at Central Bureau by Major Harry Clark and by the head, Abraham "Abe" Sinkov, and broke 2468 on 6 April 1943, for which he was awarded the Legion of Merit. Wilfrid Noyce at the Wireless Experimental Centre had realised that the first letter of the third group of each message was not random and that other groups were paired in "doublets".

At first, Arlington Hall could not find the non-randomness until Richard told them it changed about every four weeks. With this tip Arlington Hall broke the code, as did the Wireless Experimental Centre. It used a 10×10 conversion square with the plaintext digits 0-9 across the top, key digits down the side, and the table contained the cipher text digits. As well as "kana", the Chinese Telegraph Code was used to explain places or words, and the code groups 1951 or 5734 indicated that the CTC follows; an "absurd security flaw" as it was like "Stop" as a key. The CTC code group was often preceded by the "kana" groups for the same character.

=== Main Army codes ===
Many of the Army codes were known to the Allies by their four-figure discriminant numbers. The SIS at Arlington Hall gave them three-letter codes, e.g., JEM. A conference at Arlington Hall in early 1944 decided on the allocation of high-level army codes.

- 2345 Army Ordnance System or JEN
- 2468 Water Transport Code senpaku angoshu 2 a super-enciphered code or JEK
- 3366 Army Air Force General Purpose Code
- 3636 Air Safety Service Code koku hoan angoo-sho No 1
- 5555 North Pacific System
- 5678 or ATRW the main Army system to early (May) 1942, then split into 2345 and 7890
- 6633 Army Air General Purpose Code, Burma (variant of 3366)
- 6666 Philippine System, old; used by cut-off units in 1944
- 7777 South-West Pacific System
- 7890 Army General Administrative System or JEM
- BULBUL an Army air-to-ground reciphered code kuuchi renraku kanji-hyoo 2-goo.

=== Water Transport Code ===
The Army Water Transport Code senpaku angoshu 2 (2468 or JEK) was used by the Water Transport organization, the Army's own Navy, when moving troops around the Pacific. Ships signalled their noontime position, course, speed and other movement items. As the Japanese relied extensively on sea transport for isolated garrisons, the information assisted in planning air raids and action against Japanese air raids, and, through the American Seventh Fleet, submarine attacks. Breaking it in 1943 gave the Allies insight into other Army codes.

=== BULBUL ===
A three-figure reciphered air-to-ground code used by the IJA, kuuchi renraku kanji-hyoo 2-goo was known to the British as BULBUL. First broken by the Bletchley Park air section, it provided vital tactical information, so work on it was carried out in India at the Wireless Experimental Centre in Delhi. Traffic from the army operational flying units based around Meiktila in Burma was particularly valuable, aided by a book and some additive sheets from a Japanese aircraft shot down over India. By November 1944 many messages predicting air raids were intercepted, decoded and sent out as intelligence in ninety minutes. On one occasion Allied night fighters got the lot and all night we could hear Mingaladon air base calling for its lost children.

=== Find of Japanese Army records ===
In January 1944, Mainline Japanese Army codes were broken with help from a buried trunk found during the Battle of Sio in New Guinea by Australian troops of the 9th Division. The records had been left by retreating Japanese Army troops of the 20th Division. Tokyo was told the papers had been burnt, but the Japanese lieutenant did not want to reveal his position by burning them, so they were buried in a metal strongbox near a stream. They included the army codebook Rikugun Angosho Number Four, which was fed into Sinkov's IBM machines; two additive books and codes for traffic identifiers 2345, 5555, 6666, 7777 and 7870, which were now readable; and an instruction book on how to use the other books. The Central Bureau spent a day drying the damp pages, and the flood of decoded messages that ensued meant that MacArthur had to ask the U.S. Navy for assistance. Two translators, Forrest Biard and Thomas Mackie were sent from Fleet Radio Unit, Melbourne (FRUMEL). Major Sinkov and his team of Americans and Australians from Central Bureau photographed every dried page and sent these photocopies immediately to Arlington Hall, the headquarters of the U.S. Army Signal Intelligence Service, for decryption. The Allies went from decrypting only 1,846 Japanese Army messages in January 1944 to 36,000 messages in March. This intelligence windfall was so beneficial to MacArthur that he accelerated the timetable and the Admiralty Islands campaign began immediately in late February followed by the joint invasions of Hollandia and Aitape, far behind enemy lines, in late April. The Admiralty Islands campaign was originally scheduled to begin in June 1944 prior to the Japanese Army codes being broken.

== Japanese diplomatic codes and ciphers ==
The most important diplomatic cipher used by the Foreign Office was Purple. The Japanese military (army) effectively controlled Japanese foreign policy, and told the Foreign Office little. But decrypted Purple traffic was valuable militarily, particularly reports from Nazi Germany by Japanese diplomats and military and naval attachés. Arlington Hall had delayed study of the Army codes until 1942 because of the "high payoff" from diplomatic codes, but were not successful with Army codes until 1943.

The fourteen-part message breaking off negotiations with the United States in December 1941 on the eve of Pearl Harbor was in Purple; and was translated by the Americans in advance of the Japanese embassy staff who were preparing it for delivery.

The Japanese ambassador to Nazi Germany, General Hiroshi Oshima was well-informed on German military affairs and intimate with Nazi leaders. Examples of his despatches to Japan in Purple include a report that Hitler said on June 3, 1941 that in every probability war with Russia cannot be avoided. In July and August 1942 Oshima toured the Russian front, and in 1944 he saw the Atlantic Wall fortifications against the expected Allied invasion along the coasts of France and Belgium. On 4 September 1944 Hitler said to him that Germany would strike in the West, probably in November (the "Battle of the Bulge"). He was described by General George Marshall as "our main basis of information regarding Hitler's intentions in Europe".

=== Purple ===
The Purple cipher was used by the Japanese Foreign Office as its most secure system. The U.S. called this the "Purple" code, because they kept intercepted traffic in purple binders. Although the Japanese purchased the Enigma machine, they chose to base their cipher machine on a different technology, using a stepping switch rather than several rotors.

=== LA Code ===
The LA code was a low-grade code for consular messages, and was broken by the Sydney University group of Monterey codebreakers in 1941 before they moved to FRUMEL. Athanasius Treweek said, "there were several grades of diplomatic code, and they came to pieces fairly easily. The LA code was called that because every message began with the letters LA. It was child's play."

== References and further reading ==
- Bou, Jean (2012). MacArthur's Secret Bureau: The story of the Central Bureau. Loftus NSW Australia: Australian Military History Publications. ISBN 978-0-9872387-1-9.
- Budiansky, Stephen (2000). Battle of Wits: The complete story of Codebreaking in World War II. New York: Free Press. ISBN 0-684-85932-7.
- Dufty, David (2017). The Secret Code-Breakers of Central Bureau. Melbourne, London: Scribe. ISBN 9781925322187.
- Jenkins, David (1992). Battle Surface! Japan's Submarine War Against Australia 1942–44. Milsons Point NSW Australia: Random House Australia. ISBN 0-09-182638-1.
- Mundy, Liza (2017). Code Girls: The Untold Story of the American Women Code Breakers of World War II. New York, Boston: Hachette Books. ISBN 978-0-316-35253-6., Chapter 10.
- Smith, Michael (2000). The Emperor's Codes: Bletchley Park and the breaking of Japan's secret ciphers. London: Bantam Press. ISBN 0593-046412.
- Smith, Michael and Erskine, Ralph (editors): Action this Day (2001, Bantam London; pages 127-151) ISBN 0-593-04910-1 (Chapter 8: An Undervalued Effort: how the British broke Japan’s Codes by Michael Smith)
