= United States Coast Guard Unit 387 Cryptanalysis Unit =

The United States Coast Guard Unit 387 became the official cryptanalytic unit of the Coast Guard collecting communications intelligence for Coast Guard, U.S. Department of Defense, and the Federal Bureau of Investigation (FBI) in 1931. Prior to becoming official, the Unit worked under the U.S. Treasury Department intercepting communications during the prohibition. The Unit was briefly absorbed into the U.S. Navy in 1941 during World War II (WWII) before returning to be a Coast Guard unit again following the war. The Unit contributed to significant success in deciphering rum runner codes during the prohibition and later Axis agent codes during WWII, leading to the breaking of several code systems including the Green and Red Enigma machines.

== The Rise of Unit 387 ==
The U.S. Coast Guard (USCG) Unit 387 was established in the 1920s as a small embedded unit of the USCG. It did not become an officially named unit until 1931, when it was named the USCG Unit 387 by Elizebeth Friedman. The United States government established this code-communications unit to intercept ship communications and track down prohibition law breakers because “rum runners” were increasingly using radio and code systems for communication. There was an increasing need for code-breaking and encoding capabilities to counter the rum runners, as they were sophisticated criminals attempting to intercept government communications as well. By 1927, the USCG intercepted hundreds of messages but lacked the resources and personnel needed for codebreaking. Therefore, the U.S. Treasury Department appointed William and Elizebeth Friedman, a couple famous for cryptology, to create new code systems for the USCG operations against the prohibition violators and to decrypt the messages accumulating.

The Friedmans were famous cryptographers with expansive careers in Washington DC for the U.S. army, navy, Treasury and Justice Departments throughout WWI and WWII. In 1927, the rum runners commonly used two coding systems, switching them every six months. By mid-1930, rum runners significantly increased their coding abilities having virtually every rum boat use its own coding system. From April 1929 to January 1930, the San Francisco intelligence collection station alone intercepted 3,300 messages and discovered approximately 50 distinct secret coding systems which varied with up to five subsystems of codes and ciphers used by the rum runners. Between 1927 and 1928, the USCG unit successfully reduced the flow of illegal smuggling by 60 percent, from 14 million gallons of liquor to 5 million, by breaking these coding systems. An example of their successes took place on 29 September 1930, when the unit intercepted a message sent by a shore station in Vancouver, British Columbia intended for a rum runner operating in the Gulf of Mexico. The coded message contained five columns of 3-4 words each. When decoded by the unit, the message read “Henry cannot take goods now. Proceed 50 miles east Briton Island and give to Louis when he comes.”

Their successes were in part due to the USCG interception and decryption capabilities, and their innovation in fusing together all-source intelligence such as human intelligence (HUMINT), imagery intelligence (IMINT) and communications intelligence (COMINT). The cryptanalytic unit used USCG patrol boats with high-frequency direction finding gear (HFDF, also nicknamed “Huff Duff”) created by William Friedman, and Elizebeth's code-breaking expertise to locate illicit radio stations and rum runners at sea. The USCG today credits these operations as the first tactical law enforcement use of COMINT in U.S. history. Elizebeth alone decrypted approximately 12,000 messages between rum runner networks over a three-year time span. The unit decrypted a total of approximately 25,000 messages per year during prohibition. Following this success, the USCG requested that Elizebeth contribute more to their expanding operations, including codebreaking smugglers’ communications and aiding USCG partners such as the Customs Bureau and Secret Service. The U.S. Treasury Department officially transferred her to the Coast Guard in June 1931 to work as a cryptanalyst and to build up a new, official cryptanalytic unit within the Coast Guard. She began hiring and training young professionals to be cryptanalysts, women with expertise in stenography and men with backgrounds in physics, chemistry, or math. These young professionals trained in cryptanalysis officially became USCG Unit 387. The successful techniques in codebreaking and use of HFDF technology were later used by the unit in its clandestine operations in WWII, collecting information in Central and South America.

== Unit 387 Involvement in WWII ==
Following the repeal of the prohibition, the USCG Unit 387 continued intercepting communications to counter smugglers attempting to evade liquor taxes and traffic narcotics. As the unit intercepted these communications, they discovered similar message traffic that, once decrypted, suggested non-neutral activities between Axis agents and Latin America. As worldwide aggression intensified in the 1930s, the U.S. Treasury Department requested Elizebeth Friedman and Unit 387 to officially shift focus from counter-narcotics to non-neutral communications in March 1938. The U.S. Treasury Department expanded the unit's functions to include monitoring ships and communications between Germany, Italy, and Central and South America. The U.S. Navy absorbed the USCG Unit 387 under the name OP-20-GU, and later OP-G-70, in 1941. The main responsibilities included monitoring worldwide clandestine radio intelligence and COMINT collection. Although the unit was unofficially conducting clandestine operations, the Coast Guard was officially assigned to clandestine operations outside of the Western Hemisphere, and within the Western Hemisphere in joint operations with the FBI on 30 June 1942.

The unit discovered that several commercial firms in Mexico and Central and South America were encrypting communications with Germany, breaking the neutrality laws. Throughout WWII, the unit used HFDF technology to intercept approximately 10,000 enemy communications from 65 German clandestine networks and played a key role in cracking the “Enigma G” Code of the Green Enigma, the Red Enigma, the Berlin-Madrid Machine, and the Hamburg-Bordeaux Stecker codes. Their HFDF stations expanded to cover the United States with 20 primary stations, nine secondary stations, six contributory stations, and five Coast Guard radio stations. The USCG also had Cutters, trucks, briefcases, and handbags with HFDF technology inside to track “wildcat” stations across the US.

The FBI Director J. Edgar Hoover believed that intercepting messages of German agents in Latin America would be instrumental in eliminating Nazi spy networks in the US. Therefore, the Coast Guard Unit 387 also aided the FBI in intercepting and decrypting messages beginning around May 1940.

== Unit 387 Efforts in Deciphering Codes ==
In January 1940, the USCG Unit 387 intercepted suspicious circuits which transmitted one to five messages a day. Initially, the operators did not know the method or language of the enciphered text, which delayed success in attempts to solve the message codes. Once the Coast Guard intercepted sixty to seventy codes, it became apparent that the language used in the enciphered text was German and the encryption method used was likely a word separator. The operators knew the messages were in flush depth, a ciphering term which means the encrypted messages were correctly superimposed, each starting at the same point in the key. They discovered that the intercepted messages were likely enciphered using a commercial Enigma machine due to the indicators of language used and the observation that “no plain letter was represented by itself in ciphered text.” The Coast Guard had a copy of the commercial version Enigma as well as manufacturer's instructions for use. The instructions hinted at the common practice of using “X” as a separator of words and using numbers to represent their equivalent letters as displayed on the keyboard of the Enigma machine. An example of this number-word pairing is “1-Q, 2-W, 3-E, 4-R, 5-T.” After discovering the first 32 alphabets, Unit 387 created a technique for solving the reflector and successive wheels of the commercial Enigma machine, which led them to have a complete solution to all wiring of that machine.

In 1940, the Coast Guard intercepted messages that were transmitted over a Mexico-Nauen circuit. When decrypted, the messages contained a series of numbers that represented pages and line numbers of a dictionary. The cryptanalytic unit discovered that two number series repeated at the end of several messages and after some experimentation, they realized the number series spelled out “Berlin” and “Bremen.” The unit used these values for other messages intercepted and deciphered additional words: two German Agent's names “Max” and “Glenn,” several ship names, departure dates, and types of cargo. The unit was able to figure out the alphabet and associated numbers for the messages sent over this circuit. Eventually the unit also located the dictionary used to encode the messages, titled “LANGENSCHEIDTS TASCHENWOERTERBUCH der spanischen und deutschen Sprache.” They were able to decode all other messages sent using the dictionary code following this discovery.

Between 1940 and 1942, the Coast Guard intercepted messages between Latin America and Germany most commonly using the Rudolph Mosse code and passing “to and from SUDAMERO and SUDAMERIAT, Mexico; SUDAMERIAT, Hamburg; and SUDAMVORST, SUDAMERO, and SUDAMERIAT, Berlin.” The Rudolph Mosse is a type of code with letters of each code group transposed and a fixed alphabetic substitution for each of the last two letters. These messages became known as the OPALU messages. Axis agents would send the indicator “OPALU” as the first group of letters before sending the message.

In 1942, Unit 387, with the help of the Federal Communications Commission (FCC) and the Radio Security Service (RSS) intercepted messages sent between stations called TQI2 and TIM2. They believed TQI2 was in Europe and TIM2 was in South America. Between October and December that year, the unit intercepted 28 messages. Applying the lessons learned from solving the commercial Enigma machine and the new techniques passed on by the British, the unit was able to solve the Green Enigma machine encrypting these messages. The British had determined wheel motion patterns used by many of the Enigma machines by German agents in Europe. Since Unit 387 was able to decrypt several messages between TQI2 and TIM2, text revealing the messages were communications between Berlin and Argentina, they were able to apply the British techniques to determine this new machine's wheel motion patterns and the monthly ring settings the agents used to encrypt the messages. The unit had an idea of the wheel patterns and monthly ring settings by January 1943, which was confirmed by messages sent between Berlin and Argentina in June and July that year. Following these messages, they knew they had cracked the Green Enigma machine.

Following the success of solving the Green Enigma, the unit intercepted more communications between Argentina and Berlin encrypted on the Green Enigma on 4 November 1943. Using the known keys, the unit revealed the following message: “THE TRUNK TRANSMITTER WITH ACCESSORIES AND ENIGMA ARRIVED VIA RED. THANK YOU VERY MUCH. FROM OUR MESSAGE 150 WE SHALL ENCIPHER WITH THE NEW ENIGMA. WE SHALL GIVE THE OLD DEVICE TO GREEN. PLEASE ACKNOWLEDGE BY RETURN MESSAGE WITH NEW ENIGMA.” Messages were then sent from Berlin to Argentina confirming the arrival of the new Enigma machine. The Axis agents encoded these messages using the Kryha machine, of which the Coast Guard already had the keys. After reading the series of messages sent by German agents from Berlin to Latin America talking of new “Red” section keys, the unit decrypted the Red Enigma machine using similar methods.

== See also ==
- Signals intelligence
- US Army SIS
- OP-20-G
