= Arlington Hall =

Historic building in Virginia, US

Coordinates: 38.8676°N 77.1036°W

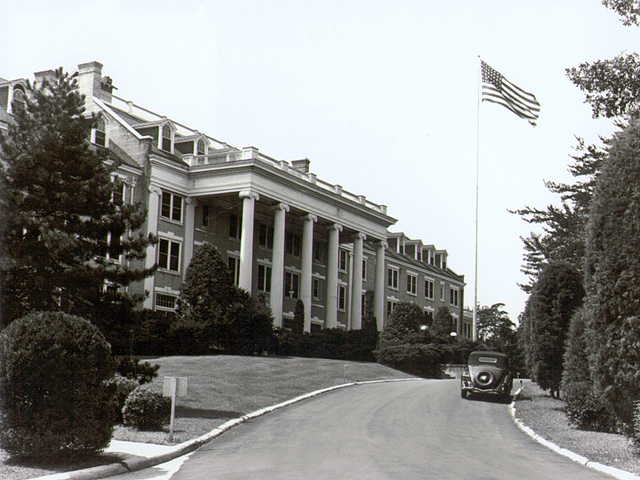
Arlington Hall Main Building (c. 1943)

Arlington Hall (also called Arlington Hall Station) is a historic building in Arlington, Virginia. Originally it was a girls' school and later the headquarters of the United States Army's Signal Intelligence Service (SIS) cryptography operations during World War II. The site houses the George P. Shultz National Foreign Affairs Training Center and the Army National Guard's Herbert R. Temple Jr. Readiness Center. It is located on Arlington Boulevard (U.S. Route 50) between S. Glebe Road (State Route 120) and S. George Mason Drive.

== History ==
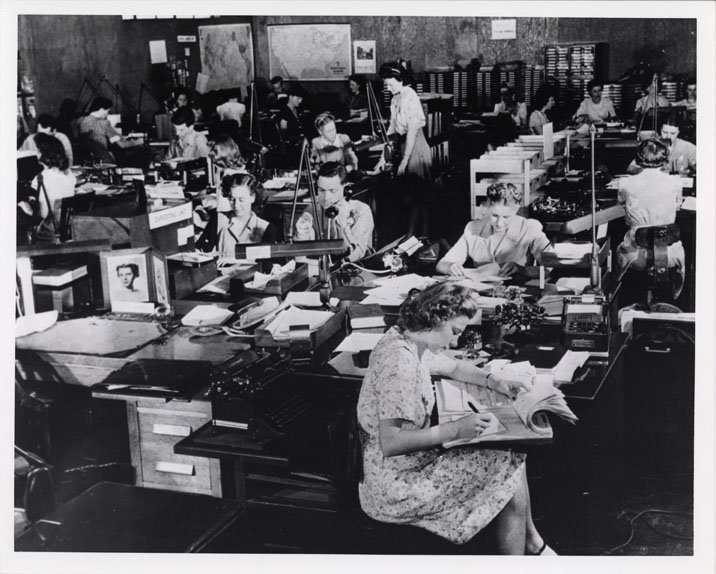
U.S. Army Signals Intelligence Service personnel at Arlington Hall (c. 1943)

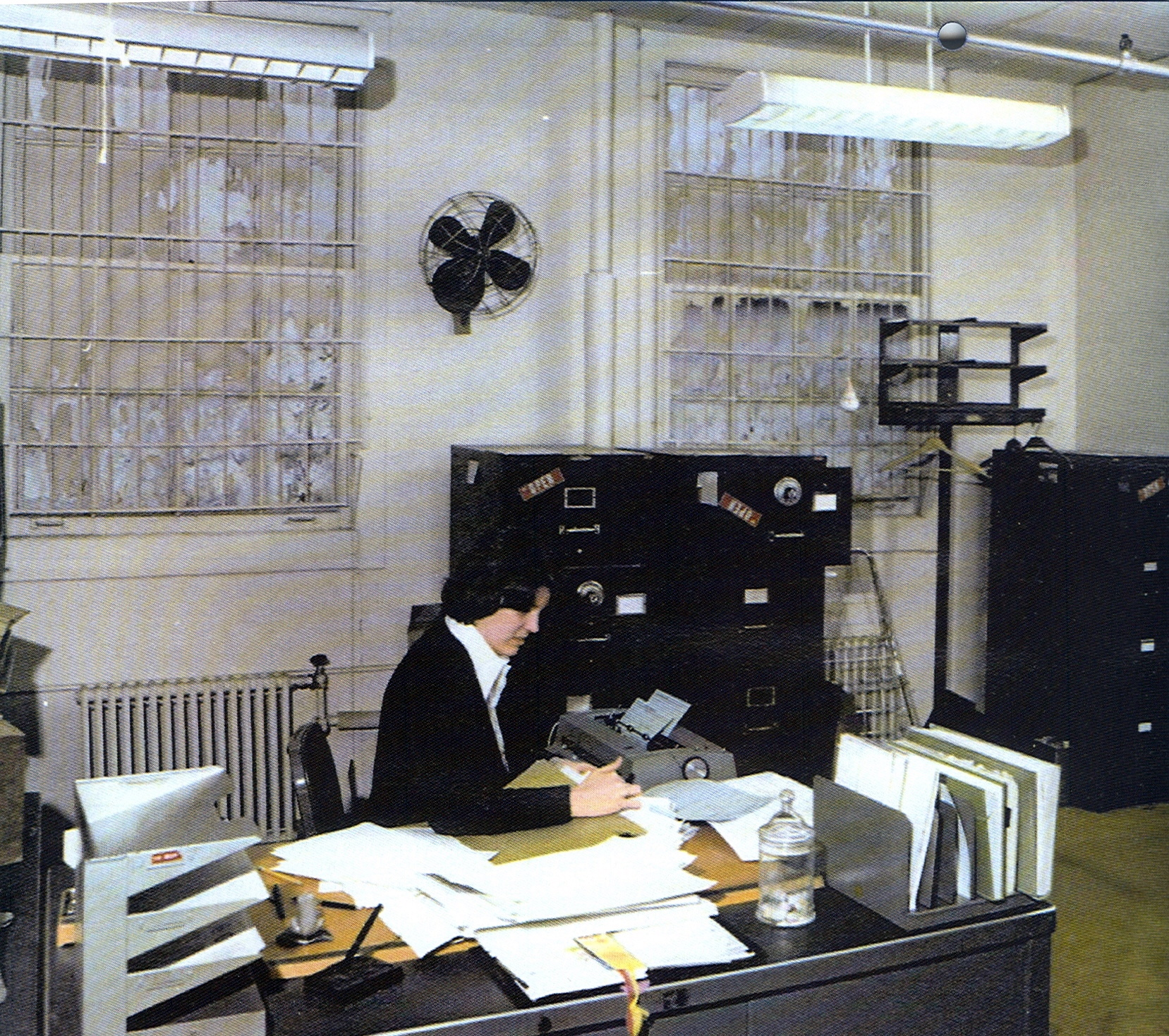
A DIA office at Arlington Hall Station (c. 1970s)

Arlington Hall was founded in 1927 as a private post-secondary women's educational institution, which by 1941 was on a 100-acre (0.40 km^{2}) campus and was called the Arlington Hall Junior College for Women. The school had financial problems in the 1930s and eventually became a non-profit institution in 1940. On June 10, 1942, the U.S. Army took possession of the facility under the War Powers Act for use by its Signals Intelligence Service.

During World War II, Arlington Hall was in many respects similar to Bletchley Park in Buckinghamshire, England (although BP also covered naval codes) and was one of only two primary cryptography operations in Washington (the other was the Naval Communications Annex, which was also housed in a commandeered private girls' school).

Arlington Hall concentrated its efforts working on the Japanese systems (including PURPLE) while Bletchley Park concentrated on European combatants. Initially work was on Japanese diplomatic codes as Japanese army codes were not solved until April 1943, but in September 1943 with success on the Army codes they were put under Solomon Kullback in a separate branch B-II, with other mainly diplomatic work under Frank Rowlett in B-III (which also had the Bombes and Rapid Analytical Machinery). The third branch B-I translated Japanese decrypts.

The Arlington Hall effort was comparable in influence to other Anglo-American Second World War-era technological efforts, such as the cryptographic work at Bletchley Park, the Naval Communications Annex, development of sophisticated microwave radar at Massachusetts Institute of Technology (MIT)'s Radiation Lab, and the Manhattan Project's development of the atomic bombs used on Hiroshima and Nagasaki in August 1945 to abruptly end the war and which later initiated further development of nuclear weapons.

After World War II, the "Russian Section" at Arlington Hall expanded. Work on diplomatic messages benefited from additional technical personnel and new analysts—among them Samuel Chew, who had focused on Japan, and linguist Meredith Gardner, who had worked on both German and Japanese messages. Chew had considerable success at defining the underlying structure of the coded Russian texts. Gardner and his colleagues began analytically reconstructing the KGB (the Soviet Union's Committee for State Security) spy agency codebooks. Late in 1946, Gardner broke the codebook's "spell table" for encoding English letters. With the solution of the spell table, SIS could read significant portions of messages which included English names and phrases. Gardner soon found himself reading a 1944 message listing prominent atomic scientists, including several with the Manhattan Project. Efforts to decipher Soviet codes continued under the classified and caveated Venona project.

Another problem soon arose—that of determining how and to whom to disseminate the extraordinary information Gardner was developing. SIS's reporting procedures did not seem appropriate because the decrypted messages could not even be paraphrased for Arlington Hall's regular intelligence customers without divulging their source. By 1946, SIS knew nothing about the federal grand jury impaneled in Manhattan, New York to probe the espionage and disloyalty charges stemming from Elizabeth Bentley's defection and other defectors from Soviet intelligence, so no one in the U.S. Government was aware that evidence against the Soviets was suddenly developing on two adjacent tracks. In late August or early September 1947, the Federal Bureau of Investigation (FBI) was informed that the Army Security Agency had begun to break into Soviet espionage messages.

By 1945, the Soviets had penetrated Arlington Hall with the placement of Bill Weisband who worked there for several years. The government's knowledge of his treason apparently was not revealed until its publication in a 1990 book co-authored by a high-level KGB defector.

Arlington Hall came under the aegis of the National Security Agency after the agency was created in 1952. From 1945 to 1977, Arlington Hall was the headquarters of the United States Army Security Agency and for a brief time in late 1948, the newly formed United States Air Force Security Service (USAFSS) until they moved to Brooks Air Force Base in San Antonio, Texas. When the United States Army Intelligence and Security Command (INSCOM) was commissioned at Arlington Hall on January 1, 1977, INSCOM absorbed the functions of the Army Security Agency into its operations. INSCOM remained at Arlington Hall until the summer of 1989, when INSCOM left for Fort Belvoir, Virginia. Beginning in January 1963, Arlington Hall served as the premier facility of the newly created Defense Intelligence Agency (DIA). In 1984, DIA departed Arlington Hall for its new headquarters on Joint Base Anacostia–Bolling (former Bolling Air Force Base in Washington, D.C.), a move that was complete by December 1984.

Arlington Hall was also home in the late 1950s and early 1960s to the Armed Services Technical Information Agency (ASTIA) which disseminated classified research to defense contractors. In 1989, the U.S. Department of Defense transferred the eastern portion of Arlington Hall to the Department of State. In October 1993, this portion of the site became the National Foreign Affairs Training Center when the State Department's Foreign Service Institute (FSI) moved there from its prior location in the Mayfair Building in Washington, D.C. The National Foreign Affairs Training Center was renamed as the George P. Shultz National Foreign Affairs Training Center in a ceremony held on May 29, 2002, named for George P. Shultz, former secretary of the treasury and secretary of state.

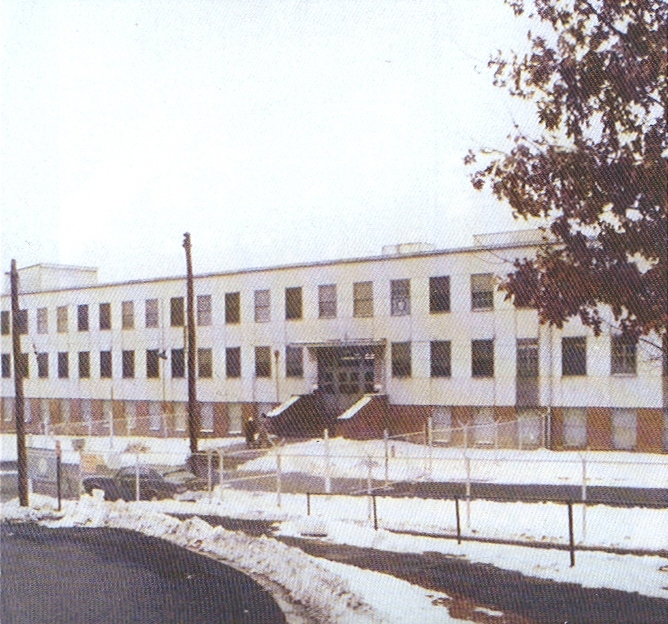
A DIA building at Arlington Hall Station (c. 1970s)

In January 2008, construction workers discovered an unexploded Civil War-era Parrott rifle shell underneath Arlington Hall. The shell had a length of one foot and a diameter of five inches. U.S. Army explosive ordnance disposal technicians from Fort Belvoir were brought in to dispose of the antique munition.

== Current uses ==
The National Park Service determined that Arlington Hall Station Historic District was eligible for inclusion on the National Register of Historic Places on October 7, 1988 (although it has not been officially listed). The historic main building of the former girls' school now houses classrooms and administrative offices for components of the Foreign Service Institute, on the campus of the George P. Shultz National Foreign Affairs Training Center. The western portion of Arlington Hall site presently houses the Army National Guard Readiness Center, which was named for Herbert R. Temple Jr. in 2017.

== See also ==
- Vint Hill Farms Station
