= Colin Hall Simpson =

Australian general

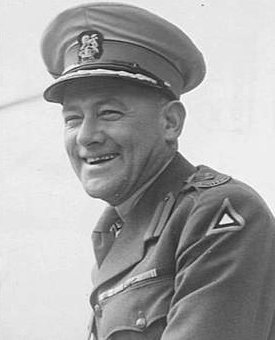
- Colonel Colin Simpson as Chief Signal Officer of I Corps, May 1940
- Born: 13 April 1894; St Kilda, Victoria, Australia
- Died: 23 August 1964 (aged 70); Heidelberg, Victoria, Australia
- Burial place: St Kilda Cemetery, St Kilda, Victoria, Australia
- Military career
- Allegiance: Australia
- Branch: Australian Army
- Service years: 1912–1946
- Rank: Major General
- Service number: VX79
- Commands: 6th Infantry Brigade (1939); 39th Infantry Battalion (1929–33); 3rd Division Signals Company (1923–29, 1935–39)
- Conflicts: First World War; Battle of Messines; Battle of Passchendaele; Second World War; Battle of Greece; Syria–Lebanon campaign; Battle of Java; New Guinea campaign; Siegfried Line campaign; Aitape–Wewak campaign; Bougainville campaign
- Awards: Commander of the Order of the British Empire; Military Cross; Colonial Auxiliary Forces Officers' Decoration; Mentioned in Despatches (2)

Major General Colin Hall Simpson, CBE, MC, VD (13 April 1894 – 23 August 1964) was an Australian Army officer who rose to the rank of major general as Signal Officer in Chief during the Second World War. He was one of the founders of Amcal, the largest retail pharmacy chain in Australia.

Simpson joined the Australian Imperial Force in 1916 and served on the Western Front in the Battle of Messines and Battle of Passchendaele. He was twice wounded and was mentioned in despatches and awarded the Military Cross. After the war he worked as a pharmacist and rose to the rank of colonel in the Militia. He transferred to the Australian Corps of Signals on its formation in 1925.

During the Second World War he participated in the campaigns in Greece and Syria as Chief Signals Officer of the I Corps. He returned to Australia in 1942 to become the Australian Army's Signal Officer in Chief. He also became the first Australian Corps of Signals officer to reach the rank of major general.

== Early life ==
Colin Hall Simpson was born in St Kilda, Victoria, on 13 April 1894, the son of Colin Simpson, a plumber, and his wife Elizabeth Fulton Simpson, née Jordan. He was educated at St Kilda Primary School, and, from 1911, at Caulfield Grammar School. While at Caulfield Grammar, Simpson joined the Australian Army Cadets, rising to the rank of sergeant. After leaving school he became an apprentice pharmacist. He served with the 49th (Prahran) Battalion in which he was commissioned as a second lieutenant on 1 March 1914. He became its assistant adjutant on 12 April 1915 and was promoted to lieutenant on 1 July 1915.

== First World War ==
Simpson was commissioned as a second lieutenant in the Australian Imperial Force (AIF) on 1 May 1916, and posted to the 3rd Pioneer Battalion, part of the 3rd Division, which was then being raised in Australia. He embarked from Port Melbourne on the transport HMAT Wandilla on 6 June 1916, arriving in England on 26 July 1916. The 3rd Division trained on the Salisbury Plain in England, where he was promoted to lieutenant on 13 October 1916. He was transferred to the 3rd Division Signal Company on 16 November 1916. Soon after, the 3rd Division moved to the Western Front, moving into the line near Armentières. Simpson was mentioned in despatches on 4 January 1917.

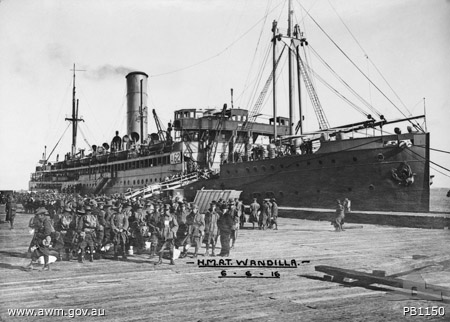
Diggers of the 3rd Pioneer Battalion board the transport HMAT Wandilla at Port Melbourne, Victoria, on 6 June 1916

The 3rd Division carried out its first offensive at the Battle of Messines in June 1917. For his part in the battle, Simpson was awarded the Military Cross. His citation read:

For conspicuous gallantry and devotion to duty. He organised the Brigade Signal Service so thoroughly that communication was maintained with every unit throughout. He was continually under shell-fire, but personally supervised all repairs, by his vigorous and cheerful manner impressing all ranks in the highest degree.

Simpson participated in the Battle of Passchendale where he was gassed and wounded. He was evacuated to England on 22 October 1917. While in hospital he applied for nine months' leave to return to Australia and complete his pharmaceutical studies. He had passed the Intermediate Examination before leaving Australia but not the Final Examination. This was granted, and he embarked for home on the transport HMAT Persic on 21 December 1917. He passed the Final Examination and was registered as a pharmacist on 10 July 1918. He never returned to the front, and his AIF appointment was terminated on 9 August 1918.

== Between the wars ==
Simpson remained in the Army as a reservist. He was posted to the 2/14th Infantry on 1 October 1918, and was promoted to captain on 16 April 1920. In the post-war reorganisation of the Army, the 2/14th was absorbed into the 14th Infantry Battalion in March 1921. In May, he transferred to the Royal Australian Engineers and joined the 3rd Division Signals Company. He was promoted to major on 1 July 1922, and became its commander, with the rank of lieutenant colonel, on 1 September 1923. On 1 January 1925, the signal units were separated from the Engineers to form the Australian Corps of Signals, and he was transferred to the new corps. He commanded the 39th Infantry Battalion from 1 July 1929 to 30 June 1933, after which he was on the unattached list for two years before resuming command of the 3rd Division Signals Company. On 1 May 1939, he assumed command of the 6th Infantry Brigade, with the temporary rank of colonel.

Simpson opened his own chemist shop in Brunswick West in 1918. On 12 August 1919 he married Jean Elizabeth Watson at the Congregational Church in Ascot Vale, Victoria. Their marriage produced two children, a son who died in infancy and a daughter, Jean Marjorie. One of the witnesses at their wedding ceremony was a fellow Militia officer, Alan Ramsay, who later married Jean's sister Edna. In 1937, Simpson banded together with D. E. Robertson and A. E. Moore to create the Allied Master Chemists of Australia Ltd, today better known as Amcal. They invited other pharmacists to join them to compete against the growing market power of major retailers. The business grew from 12 members in 1937 to over 100 by 1946. Today Amcal is the largest retail pharmacy chain in Australia.

== Second World War ==
=== Middle East ===
Simpson joined the Second Australian Imperial Force on 15 October 1939 with the rank of lieutenant colonel. He was allocated the AIF service number VX79, and assumed command of the Australian Corps Signals. When the I Corps was formed in April 1940, Lieutenant General Sir Thomas Blamey was appointed its commander, and Simpson its Chief Signals Officer, with a promotion to the rank of colonel.

Simpson embarked on the transport Nieuw Holland on 15 September 1940, arriving in Kantara, Egypt, on 12 October. He met with his British counterparts and discussed arrangements for the creation of an AIF Signals School in the Middle East. Some negotiation was required before this proposal was finally accepted. He was disappointed at the standard of training that had been achieved by the I Corps and 6th Division signals units in the Middle East, and just as disappointed with the reinforcements arriving from Australia. Both the standard of training of the units and the establishment of the schools intended to remedy the situation were hampered by a serious shortage of equipment. The 6th Division's list of critical shortfalls—by no means restricted to signals equipment—included 120 telephones and 120 miles (190 km) of electrical cable. Not until January 1941—after the 6th Division had been committed to battle in Libya—did the cable become available in Australia. Some units equipped themselves with captured enemy materiel.

Simpson arrived in Greece on 7 March 1941 as part of the I Corps advance party. The Battle of Greece presented a major challenge for Simpson's signal units, as rugged terrain, enemy action and frequent troop movements conspired to frustrate their efforts to maintain reliable communications. The news that Yugoslavia had offered to surrender reached Blamey from a BBC broadcast on 15 April picked up on a receiver built into a kerosene case that Simpson had insisted that he take. Many pieces of signal equipment was lost during the fighting, and some had to be destroyed following the order to evacuate Greece. Simpson embarked for Crete on HMS Phoebe on 25 April. From there he took a flying boat to Alexandria. His first priority on arrival was arranging for the lost equipment to be replaced.

The shortage of signal equipment was an important factor in the delay in committing the I Corps to the Syria–Lebanon campaign until it became clear that General Sir Henry Maitland Wilson could not adequately control operations from his headquarters at the King David Hotel in Jerusalem. Once again, the signallers had to battle with inhospitable terrain. The hills and atmospheric conditions made reception difficult for the radio operations, and those same hills, along with shortages of cable, made the linesmen's task no less difficult. He was mentioned in despatches, and appointed a Commander of the Order of the British Empire for "maintenance of communications under difficult conditions in the Grecian campaign".

Simpson was promoted to the rank of brigadier on 11 September 1941, becoming the first officer of the Australian Corps of Signals to reach that rank. He was involved in a serious motor vehicle accident on 13 September 1941 and suffered severe lacerations, a concussion, and a broken collarbone, rib and finger. He was taken to the 2/1st General Hospital and was evacuated to Australia on the hospital ship MS Wanganella. He returned to the Middle East by air, arriving back on 20 January 1942.

=== South West Pacific ===
Within days, Simpson was heading east again, taking a flying boat to Batavia, where he joined the advance party of the I Corps, which was being sent from the Middle East to the Dutch East Indies to counter the Japanese threat. He met there with the local authorities regarding signals arrangements for the defence of Java. These were soon well in hand, but the tactical situation rapidly deteriorated to the extent that the I Corps was ordered to leave Java on 21 February 1942. Simpson departed on the troop ship Orcades, which arrived in Adelaide on 14 March.

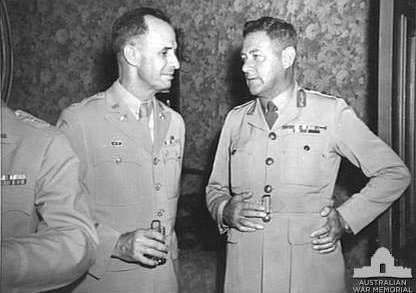
Simpson (right) with Major General Spencer B. Akin (left), the Chief Signal Officer at GHQ

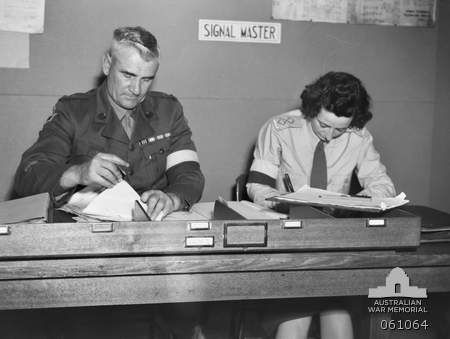
Signallers on duty at Allied Land Forces Headquarters (LHQ) in Melbourne

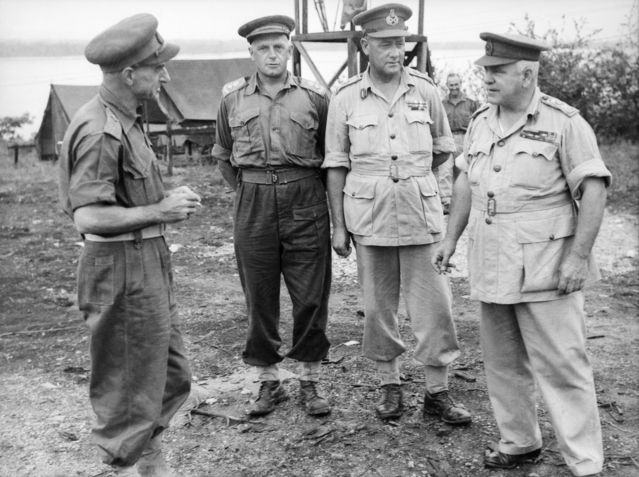
Simpson (second from right) visits the 6th Division in the Wewak Area with Blamey (right), and talks with its commander, Major General Jack Stevens (left)

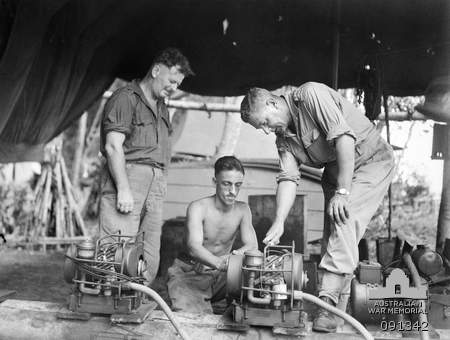
Simpson (right), inspects Chorehorse chargers at 3 Division Signals during his visit to Bougainville in April 1945.

Blamey was appointed Commander in Chief of the Australian Military Forces on 27 March. He instituted a sweeping reorganisation of the Army, replacing officers with men who had experience in the Middle East. Simpson became the Signal Officer in Chief on 6 April, with the rank of major general, the first Australian Corps of Signals officer to reach that rank.

One of Simpson's first tasks was to confer with the Chief Signals Officer at General Douglas MacArthur's General Headquarters (GHQ) South West Pacific Area, Brigadier General Spencer B. Akin. The two established mechanisms to divide responsibility for the theatre's communications between the two armies, which often worked together on the same projects. An important outcome of their first meeting was the creation of the Central Bureau as a combined signals intelligence organisation. Simpson had been thinking about such an organisation while on the Orcades. Blamey had an appreciation of signals intelligence from his time as Deputy Commander in Chief in the Middle East, and readily gave his support. After a slow start, signals intelligence became an important element of the war in the South West Pacific.

Perhaps Simpson's most ambitious project was the laying of a submarine cable between Cape York and New Guinea. A cable laying ship, the SS Mernoo, was chartered, and two old cables that ran across the Bass Strait were lifted and re-laid across the Torres Strait in October 1943. When the land connections were completed in December 1943, it became possible to send a message all the way from Melbourne to Port Moresby. Simpson, who was on an inspection tour of New Guinea, was on hand for the receipt of the first message. In November 1944, he visited the front in the Netherlands, Belgium and France, returning to Australia via the United States and Canada.

To man his signals units, Simpson sought to obtain some 4,000 Australian Women's Army Service (AWAS) personnel. Two special signal training battalions were activated to cater for them, and Simpson inspected the 2nd Signal Training Battalion (AWAS) at Ivanhoe Grammar School with Lieutenant Colonel Sybil Irving on 6 July 1942. By 1945, the Australian Corps of Signals numbered some 25,000 men and women. The large numbers of women serving in Signals units caused friction between Irving and Simpson over what degree of control he exercised over them.

Aware that signals are usually forgotten when the signallers are doing their best work, Simpson attempted to obtain various accolades for his corps. He held ceremonial parades through Melbourne to celebrate VE Day on 10 May 1945, and VP Day on 20 August 1945. He attempted to get the title "Royal" granted in recognition of its wartime service. This occurred on 10 November 1948.

== Later life ==
Simpson handed over the position of Signal Officer in Chief to Brigadier A. D. Malloy on 23 May 1946. He was placed on the retired list with the honorary rank of major general on 19 December 1946. He served as Colonel Commandant for the Australian Corps of Signals in Southern Command from June 1958 to June 1963, and was Colonel Commandant of the corps from September 1959 to December 1960. In 1946 he was appointed director of the Columbia Graphophone Company (Australia).

Simpson was a keen supporter of the Essendon Football Club, serving as its vice president from 1947 to 1964. He was awarded a life membership in 1957. He was elected Victorian State President of the Australian Legion of Ex-Servicemen and Women in 1948. He resigned in October after a dispute with the State Council over its suspension of two members for being communists, which Simpson opposed. Yet Simpson was no communist sympathiser; far from it. He organised The Association, a clandestine right wing paramilitary organisation headed by Blamey which was established to counter a possible communist coup. The Association disbanded in 1950.

== Death and legacy ==
Simpson died of cancer in Heidelberg Repatriation Hospital on 23 August 1964. He was survived by his wife and daughter. He was buried in St Kilda Cemetery after a funeral service at St Cuthbert's Church in Brighton, Victoria. His pall bearers included Lieutenant General Sir Edmund Herring and Major General Alan Ramsay.

Simpson Barracks at Watsonia in Melbourne was named in his honour in 1986. It is considered the home of the Royal Australian Corps of Signals and contains the Defence Force School of Signals and the Royal Australian Corps of Signals Museum.

== See also ==
- List of Caulfield Grammar School people
