= Central Bureau =

WW2 Allied military unit

- Plaque at 21 Henry St, Ascot, Queensland
- Active: 1942-1945
- Country: Australia, United States
- Branch: United States Army, Australian Army, US Navy, Royal Australian Navy
- Type: Signals Intelligence
- Engagements: Second World War: South West Pacific Theatre; New Guinea campaign

Commanders
- Director: Spencer B. Akin (US)
- Assistant Director: Mic Sandford (2nd AIF)
- Assistant Director: Roy Booth (RAAF)
- Deputy Director: Abraham Sinkov (US)

The Central Bureau was one of two Allied signals intelligence (SIGINT) organisations in the South West Pacific area (SWPA) during World War II. Central Bureau was attached to the headquarters of the Supreme Commander, Southwest Pacific Area, General Douglas MacArthur. The role of the Bureau was to research and decrypt intercepted Imperial Japanese Army (land and air) traffic and work in close co-operation with other SIGINT centers in the United States, United Kingdom and India. Air activities included both army and navy air forces, as there was no independent Japanese air force.

The other unit was the joint Royal Australian Navy/United States Navy Fleet Radio Unit, Melbourne (FRUMEL), which reported directly to CINCPAC (Admiral Chester Nimitz) in Hawaii and the Chief of Naval Operations (Admiral Ernest King) in Washington, D.C.

Central Bureau is the precursor to the Defense Signals Bureau, which after a number of name changes is (from 2013) called the Australian Signals Directorate.

== Structure ==
Central Bureau comprised:

- administrative personnel
- supply personnel
- cryptographic personnel
- cryptanalytic personnel
- interpreters
- translators
- a field section which included the intercept and communications personnel

== History ==
=== Origins ===
Beginning in January 1942, U.S. Navy stations in Hawaii (Station HYPO), Cavite/Corregidor (Station CAST) and OP-20-G (Station NEGAT, at Washington) began issuing formal intelligence decrypts far in advance of the U.S. Army or Central Bureau.

General MacArthur had his own signals intelligence unit, Station 6, while he was in command in the Philippines before the start of the war, and was not fully dependent on the U.S. Navy for that type of information. However, most of the signals intelligence he received was from the U.S. Navy's Station CAST, originally at Cavite in the Manila Navy Yard, and evacuated to Corregidor Island after Japanese successes. Prior to the war, it had to be sent by courier, which caused some delay and annoyance.

General MacArthur escaped from Corregidor in the Philippines in a PT boat to Mindanao and flew to Australia from Del Monte on a Boeing B-17 Flying Fortress. He made his way to Melbourne, arriving there on 22 March 1942.

The Signals Intelligence units operating in Australia at the time of MacArthur's arrival in Melbourne were as follows:

- No. 4 Australian Special Wireless Section at Park Orchards near Ringwood in Melbourne
- A small Diplomatic and Press intercept section at Park Orchards
- A Diplomatic cryptographic and intelligence section at Victoria Barracks, Melbourne
- Some British Army Signals personnel from the Far East Combined Bureau who had escaped from Java
- A small RAAF Intercept section in Darwin
- A small RAN intercept and Direction Finding (D/F) organisation
- A small RAN cryptographic and intelligence section at the Navy Office in Melbourne

and, eventually, after evacuation from Corredigor by submarine,

- the personnel of Station CAST, the US Navy SIGNIT group in the Far East. They were responsible for channeling all SIGINT information to OP-20-G in Washington. It became known as FRUMEL and obtained IBM equipment in 1942 to replace that which had been left behind in Manila Bay on leaving Corregidor and employed it throughout their tenure in Melbourne.

=== Establishment of Central Bureau ===
One of Macarthur's first decisions when he arrived in Melbourne was to expand the SIGINT operations already existing in Australia.

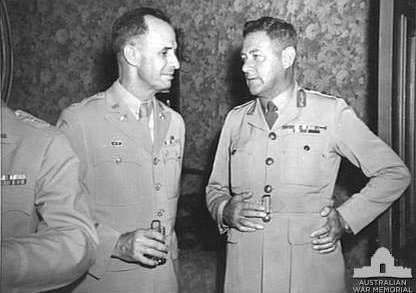
General Colin Simpson (right) with Major General Spencer B. Akin (left), the Chief Signal Officer at GHQ

Brigadier General Spencer B. Akin, MacArthur's Chief Signals Officer held discussions with Major General Colin Simpson. They agreed that a Research and Control Centre to handle Signals Intelligence (SIGINT) was needed. MacArthur subsequently issued orders for the formation of two complementary groups:

- An intercept organisation known initially as No. 5 Wireless Section
- A research and control centre known as the Central Bureau.

Initially Central Bureau was made up of 50% American, 25% Australian Army and 25% RAAF personnel.

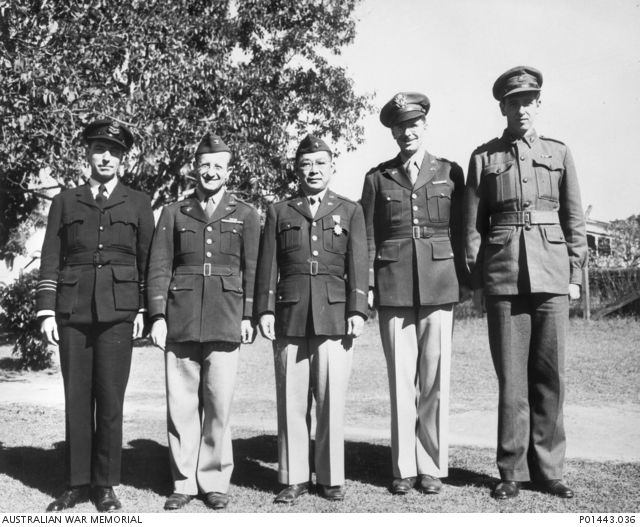
Directors of the Central Bureau in Brisbane in 1944. Sinkov is second from the left.

Central Bureau was a joint US-Australian signal intelligence organisation, established on 15 April 1942 under the command of US Army Major General Spencer B. Akin, with headquarters in Melbourne.Its role was to research and decrypt army and air intercept traffic and work in close co-operation with other SIGINT centres in the USA, United Kingdom and India.

A small Naval cryptographic group also became part of the secret new unit. It was led by Commander Eric Nave, who with Professor Dale Trendall had been working on Japanese diplomatic and naval codes at Victoria Barracks.

Central Bureau was established in a gabled, ivy-clad mansion called "Cranleigh" in Domain Road, at South Yarra, Melbourne.

Major General Akin's Executive Officer, Major (later Colonel) Joe R. Sherr had been evacuated from the Philippines (Station 6). He was responsible for arranging for the first group of US "SIGINT" personnel to come to Australia, and as Akin's control was indirect he was responsible for day-to-day running of the bureau. He was killed when returning from a liaison visit to the wireless Experimental Centre in India, when his aircraft crashed 3 km from Calcutta airfield on 21 September 1943. Sandford had wanted to send "Pappy" Clark (Note: Stanley Robert Irving Clark. Australian Army VX21132 (MBE)) to the conference but Akin said that MacArthur would not agree to send Clark (only a major) and so sent Colonel Sherr instead.

He was succeeded by Major Abraham "Abe" Sinkov, a mathematician, who was appointed assistant director of Central Bureau. Sinkov had previously been a senior cryptographer in the US Army Signals Intelligence Service under William F. Friedman. Sinkov had previously been in charge of an intercept station in Panama. He had visited Britain in 1941 to facilitate the exchange of cryptographic information.

With Sinkov (US Army), the three assistant directors were Australians Alistair "Mic" Sandford (Major then Lt-Col, Second AIF) and Roy Booth (Squadron Leader then Wing Commander, RAAF). They acted as head of their respective service organisations; with Sandford the bureau executive officer under Sherr, then Booth from 1944. The bureau functioned well and harmoniously, with job demarcation as Australian experience was from wireless interception and traffic analysis in the Middle East and the Americans in breaking codes and cyphers, although this "broke down" as the war went on. Signals organisations tend to be "meritocratic" rather than on rank.

Experienced intercept Kana operators from a Royal Australian Air Force unit at Townsville were assigned to the new Central Bureau. The RAAF at the time had a number of Kana operators being trained and were about to train a further 13 WAAAF personnel. (Katakana is one of the syllabic forms of written Japanese).

The cryptanalysts who had operated from the Malinta Tunnel during the Battle of Corregidor got out to Australia by submarine in two groups. Their equipment was pushed into Manila Bay. They were used to assist the Australian Wireless Group units. A group of cryptographic, cryptanalytic and translator personnel from the Japanese section of the Washington Signal Intelligence Service were also moved to Australia. More Australians were also recruited to Central Bureau after it was established.

=== Central Bureau-FRUMEL relations ===
MacArthur was not happy to depend on the Navy's discretion in handling his SIGINT requirements. He felt he had experienced problems with such an arrangement when he was in Manila. MacArthur's Intelligence Officer (G-2) was Major General Charles A. Willoughby.

In Australia the rules laid down by Cmdr Rudy Fabian the head of FRUMEL (through Admiral Leary) for receiving FRUMEL briefings said that Fabian or his representative were to brief MacArthur and his chief of staff Richard K. Sutherland at 1400 each day, but could not copy or distribute the material. The representative was not to be kept waiting. Only MacArthur and Sutherland were to be present; Willoughby, his G2 was excluded. Once Fabian burnt a document in front of Willoughby on his way out and dropped the ashes in his bin to demonstrate that he was not allowed to see it!

Commander Nave moved to Central Bureau in mid-1942 from the combined Australian Navy/U.S. Navy operation in Melbourne known as FRUMEL, which came under U.S. Navy control (Lt Rudy Fabian) in mid-1942. Fabian thought Nave had breached security, and got rid of Nave and the civilians (including Professor Thomas Room, who also went to Central Bureau); the Holden Agreement specifically stated that Eric Nave was not to work at FRUMEL, indicating that Fabian had "friends in high places".

Although Nave headed up the "Solutions" division there, most records indicate he personally dealt with minor Japanese naval codes and simple substitution ciphers in spite of his Japanese language capability and long history with Japanese codes. However Duffy wrote that Nave was actively working on JN-25 until the day he was expelled from Monterrey. Colonel Sinkov and his American staff worked on the high-level Japanese Army codes.

Central Bureau was an unusual cryptographic organisation, coming under the direct command of an area commander (MacArthur) rather than reporting to a central cryptographic organisation; as confirmed by Marshall's reply. This decision led to periodic ructions in the American military establishment about MacArthur's command having its own cryptographic service under his command; a privilege that he jealously guarded.

=== No.1. Wireless Unit ===
On 25 April 1942 the small RAAF Intercept Station operating in two back-to-back houses at 21 Sycamore Street and 24 French Street in the suburb of Pimlico in Townsville was given its new name of No. 1 Wireless Unit and became part of Central Bureau. The newly named Unit included 7 RAAF, 1 AMF and 4 United States Army personnel in No. 1 Wireless Unit at Townsville. This RAAF Unit had started earlier in March 1942 as a small intercept station located in the initial two houses at Pimlico under Wing Commander Booth. By 6 July 1942 the intercept operator numbers at Central Bureau had increased from six to twenty nine.

=== Coral Sea and Kokoda ===
A message on 9 April 1942 indicated that the "RZP Campaign" against Port Moresby was to be an invasion not an air raid and which would isolate Australia from America. Fabian at FRUMEL briefed MacArthur who was "incredulous" as he expected the target would be New Caledonia, so Fabian explained the (JN-25) code-breaking process and showed him the Japanese commander’s intercepted message with the objectives to restrict enemy fleet movements and attack the north coast of Australia. So a transport due to leave the next day for New Caledonia was sent to Port Moresby. On 23 April Fabian showed MacArthur that the IJN was amassing a large force at Truk, and planned to occupy Tulagi also. MacArthur got an Australian reconnaissance plane to "discover" the Port Moresby invasion force on 5 May, leading to the Battle of the Coral Sea.

On 19 and 23 May messages indicated that the Japanese were proposing to land at Buna and go overland over the Owen Stanley Range via the Kokoda Track to Port Moresby; though MacArthur, Willoughby and Blamey were unconvinced saying "Nobody in their right senses would land there". Blamey took "minimal precautions" to defend the track, resulting in heavy losses for the 39th Battalion sent there.

=== Move from Melbourne to Brisbane ===
On 20 July 1942, General MacArthur moved his headquarters to Brisbane. A separate American intelligence operation was located nearby in a building called "Palma Rosa" at 9 Queens Road, Hamilton. "Palma Rosa" was commandeered by the Counter Intelligence Corps, G-2 Section, Headquarters U.S. Army Forces in the Far East (U.S.A.F.F.E.).

Central Bureau also relocated to Brisbane in September, with the American contingent of six officers and eighteen enlisted men moving first. The bureau moved to the suburb of Ascot, not far from the new American airfield at Eagle Farm Airport. Staff were accommodated as boarders in private homes or in military camps with daily transport by truck or bus. Officers obtained rented accommodation around Ascot and nearby suburbs. Mic Sandford the head of the Australian Army contingent rented a house at 50 Elderney Terrace in nearby Hamilton; this became a social centre and the scene of frequent dinner and drinking parties.

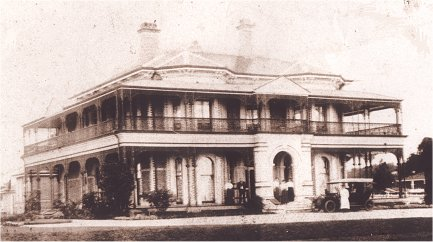
21 Henry St, Ascot, Brisbane

The CB headquarters was in "Nyrambla", a huge house at 21 Henry Street built as a grand mansion in 1886, although the large 6 ha section was subdivided from 1905 and the house was converted into flats in the late 1920s. The house still retained rooms with marble fireplaces, ornate plaster and 4.8m high ceilings, and the building remained the main administrative and training centre for the bureau.

When the bureau assumed an augmented role to coordinate land and air forces signals intelligence, additional facilities were located a few minutes walk away at a small public park opposite the Ascot railway station Hence it became known as "Ascot Park" although officially called "Oriel Park". Between the station, Kitchener Road and Lancaster Road, the park had nearly 20 temporary army wooden huts by mid-1943 and 31 by September 1945. Across the road at 77 Kitchener Road a disused brick Fire Station was used for banks of IBM punched card equipment used by cryptanalysts to analyze intercepted cyphertext. The machines had been in the garage at the rear of 21 Henry Street but the noise from all-hours operation bought complaints from neighbours. When the IBM machines were removed from 21 Henry Street the garage was occupied by No. 11 Australian Cypher Section and filled with Typex machines which were operated mostly by Australian Women's Army Service (AWAS) personnel.

=== Australian Special Intelligence Personnel Sections (ASIPS) ===
In 1942, Sandford raised two intelligence sections to operate at the wireless sites in the field. These personnel, known as ASIPS, would be a liaison between Central Bureau and the Kana operators, greatly increasing the speed in which messages could be decrypted and translated. The first unit was stationed at Coomalie Creek Airfield, NT, under the command of Captain William E Clarke. This ASIP unit, in direct coordination with local air force commanders, decrypted mainly tactical codes which allowed Allied forces to combat the air raids against the north of Australia. In 1943 these ASIP units were sent to New Guinea.

=== Allied Translator and Interpreter Section ===
Starting in October 1942, Japanese POWs were interrogated by a joint US-Australian unit called ATIS at two houses called "Tighnabruaich" and "Witton House" at Indooroopilly in Brisbane. ATIS was staffed by Japanese-Americans (Nisei) and Australians who spoke Japanese. After interrogation, the Japanese POWs were often sent to the larger POW camp at Cowra, NSW. Translators at Indooroopilly were also involved in the translation of the captured codebooks from Sio.

The heritage-listed site is currently known as the Combined Services Detailed Interrogation Centre, Brisbane

=== Shootdown of Yamamoto ===
In April 1943, the US Navy in Melbourne and Hawaii intercepted a Japanese naval message encoded in JN-25, the main and most secure Japanese naval code. The US Navy had not cracked JN-25, so they were only able to recover small portions of the message. The Japanese garrison commander on Ballale did not have JN-25 so the message was retransmitted to him by Japanese signals in Rabaul in a less secure army air to ground code. This message was intercepted by Australian wireless units in Port Moresby and translated by the ASIPs unit in Townsville. This message was forwarded to FRUMEL and Hawaii which allowed the US Navy codebreakers to inform Nimitz that the message was broken.

The message contained Admiral Isoroku Yamamoto's itinerary for an upcoming trip to Rabaul. Admiral Yamamoto was the Commander in Chief of the Combined Japanese Fleet, the architect of the attack on Pearl Harbor.

However, the message said that the trip might be postponed due to weather, so confirmation was needed. This came when another Army Air/Ground signal was intercepted by 51 Wireless Section in Coomalie Creek near Darwin. This intercept was sent to Central Bureau at 21 Henry Street, Ascot, in Brisbane where it was decrypted and forwarded to FRUMEL where it was reportedly translated by a U.S. Navy linguist.

Although Central Bureau may have decrypted the message, the interception of his flight was based on decrypts of Japanese naval messages by FRUPAC/Station HYPO in Hawaii, FRUMEL, OP-20-G in Washington and Station AL on Guadalcanal. Major Lasswell USMC in Hawaii decrypted the Japanese Naval message first and Captain Layton (Pacific Fleet Intelligence in Hawaii) gave it to Admiral Nimitz who authorized a shootdown attempt after determining from ComNavAirSoPac that it could be done with by one of his Army Air Corp units on Guadalcanal.

Operation Vengeance was carried out on April 18 and resulted in the shooting down of Yamamoto's "Betty" bomber by P-38s from Henderson Field, Guadalcanal.

=== The Sio Box ===
Central Bureau did not break any high level Japanese Army codes until mid-1943 success with the Water Transport Code. In January 1944, one main line Japanese Army code was broken with help from a buried trunk found at Sio, New Guinea, left by retreating Japanese Army troops of the 20th Division. The Bureau spent a day drying the damp pages, and the flood of decoded messages (2000 per day) that ensued meant that the Bureau had to ask the US Navy for assistance with translations. FRUMEL sent translators from Melbourne who had experience with the additional vocabulary and jargon associated with the larger JN-25 code. The Japanese thought that the code books had been destroyed and therefore did not issue a code change.

Central Bureau's decryption of the mainline Army code, combined with traffic analysis helped the Allies avoid Japanese strongpoints during the Admiralty Islands campaign, the Allied capture of a group of islands to the north-west of Rabaul.

In early April 1944, the Japanese changed their mainline code, suspecting correctly that the old codebooks had been compromised. This meant all mainline Japanese army traffic became unreadable to the Allies overnight.

In April and May, Central Bureau, together with analysts from FRUMEL and FRUPAC, was involved in the detection of the Take Ichi convoy, which was intending to reinforce Japanese positions in New Guinea and the Philippines. US submarines attacked the convoy, sinking a number of transports and killing over 4000 soldiers

In May 1944, following the Allied invasion of Hollandia in Operation Reckless, Central Bureau moved to Hollandia. In October they moved to Leyte and at the end of the war they were based in San Miguel on Luzon. After the war, they were transferred to Tokyo.

=== End of the war ===
On August 14, Emperor Hirohito sent a message through Swiss diplomats that Japan would capitulate under the terms of the Potsdam Declaration. On the morning of August 15, MacArthur was notified of the emperor's offer of surrender. However, at this point it was still just an offer. MacArthur and General Akin summoned the Central Bureau Australian army officer Major Stan "Pappy" Clark to Manila to make contact with the Japanese. After trying to contact Radio Tokyo and various Japanese army frequencies Clark was finally able to make contact with a Japanese diplomatic station in Singapore. Following this, a secret Japanese delegation was organised to travel to Manila to meet MacArthur.

Akin offered Clark a commission in the US Army to come to Japan, but Clark refused, saying "I've had enough. I want to go home".

Central Bureau continued to intercept Japanese communications in the days following the end of the war, providing information on how Japanese forces were reacting to the surrender. Other intercepts regarded information on the condition and treatment of Allied prisoners-of-war. Dufty claims that although these intercepts were "clear evidence" that prisoners had been mistreated, they could never be used in a war crimes trial without jeopardising Ultra's secrets.

== See also ==
- Far East Combined Bureau
- National HRO - radio receiver used by the signals units in New Guinea
- No 1 Canadian Special Wireless Group - Canadian unit sent to Australia during 1944. Performed duties similar to the RAAF Special Wireless units
