= Abraham Sinkov =

American cryptanalyst (1907–1998)

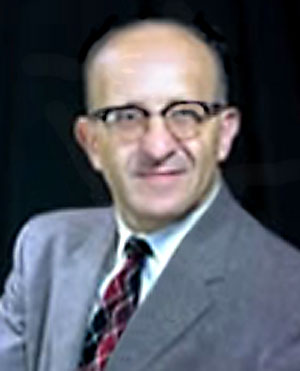
- Born: August 22, 1907; Philadelphia, Pennsylvania, U.S.
- Died: January 19, 1998 (aged 90); Maricopa, Arizona, U.S.
- Education: City College of New York, B.S.; George Washington University, Ph.D
- Scientific career
- Fields: Cryptography, Mathematics
- Workplaces: University of Maryland; National Security Agency; Arizona State University
- Thesis: Families of Groups Generated by Two Operators of the Same Order (1933)
- Doctoral advisor: Francis Edgar Johnston

Abraham Sinkov (August 22, 1907 – January 19, 1998) was a US cryptanalyst. An early employee of the U.S. Army's Signal Intelligence Service, he held several leadership positions during World War II, transitioning to the new National Security Agency after the war, where he became a deputy director. After retiring in 1962, he taught mathematics at Arizona State University.

== Biography ==
Sinkov was the son of Jewish immigrants Morris (Mordechai Eliezer) and Ethel (née Etel Constantinowsky) from Alexandria, Russia, which is now Oleksandriya, Kirovohrad Oblast, Ukraine. Sinkov was born in Philadelphia, but grew up in Brooklyn. After graduating from Boys High School he took his B.S. in mathematics from City College of New York. (By coincidence, one of his close friends at Boys High and CCNY was Solomon Kullback). Mr. Sinkov taught in New York City schools but was unhappy with the working conditions and anxious to use his mathematics knowledge in practical ways.

=== Early career ===
The opportunity for a career change came in 1930. Sinkov and Kullback took the Civil Service examination and placed high. Both received mysterious letters from Washington asking about their knowledge of foreign languages. Sinkov knew French and Kullback, Spanish. This was acceptable to their prospective employer, and they were offered positions as junior cryptanalysts. Although neither was quite certain what a cryptanalyst did, they accepted.

The small Signal Intelligence Service (SIS) organization (Sinkov and Kullback were the third and fourth employees there) had the primary mission of compiling codes and ciphers for use by the U.S. Army. Its secondary task was to attempt to solve selected foreign codes and ciphers—this was not necessarily done for intelligence purposes but to keep the cryptanalysts abreast of new developments in the field.

William Friedman put his new employees through a rigorous course of study of his own design in cryptology, bringing them to high levels of skill in making and breaking codes and ciphers. Friedman also encouraged other self-improvement endeavors: his employees trained summers at a camp at Ft. Meade to earn commissions in the military reserves. Both Sinkov and Kullback also went on to receive doctorates in mathematics. Sinkov received his PhD in mathematics in 1933 from The George Washington University. In 1936, Sinkov was assigned to the Panama Canal Zone, where he established the U.S. Army's first permanent intercept site outside the continental United States.

=== World War II ===
SIS grew slowly throughout the early 1930s. However, successes against Japanese diplomatic codes using machine systems after 1935 provided the U.S. government with critical information during a series of crises. This success had practical consequences for SIS, as well. For the first time, SIS began to garner respect from its military superiors. Once the military understood that this small organization could read sensitive messages from a potential adversary, the Signal Corps increased the SIS budget and authorized increased hiring of cryptanalysts.

In 1940, even though the United States was not officially a combatant, the U.S. and Britain initiated exchanges of technical material. Included in this was a cautious sharing of cryptologic information: the British in stages revealed the extent of their considerable success against high-level German systems, the U.S. its equivalent success against Japanese. This led to an unprecedented level of cooperation in communication intelligence (COMINT) between the two countries during the war, resulting in more personnel, bigger budgets, and a wider range of activities for the organization.

=== Sinkov mission ===
In January 1941, while Britain battled Nazi Germany but nearly a year before the United States entered the Second World War, Captain Sinkov was selected as a member of a delegation to the United Kingdom for initial sharing of information about the two countries' respective cryptologic programs. The delegation returned in April with mixed results to report. Sinkov and his colleagues had been shown Bletchley Park, the secret headquarters for British cryptology, and exchanged information on German and Japanese systems. It is still unclear how much the American delegation was told about British success against the German Enigma machine, but Sinkov later recalled that they were told about the Enigma problem only a short while before the delegation was to leave, and that details were sketchy. Nevertheless, the mission to the UK was a success overall and helped give US-UK cryptologic relations a strong practical foundation.

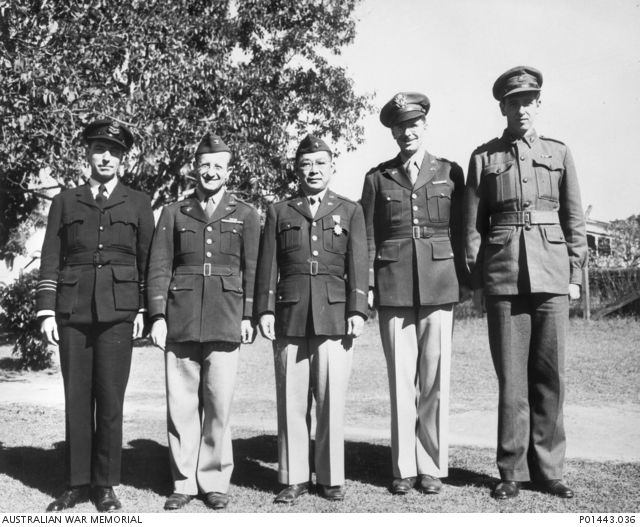
Directors of the Central Bureau in Brisbane in 1944. Sinkov is second from the left.

After the Japanese attack on Pearl Harbor on December 7, 1941, the Japanese also attacked the Philippine Islands. General Douglas MacArthur had been ordered to leave the Philippines and re-establish U.S. Army headquarters in Australia, from whence counterattacks might be launched. MacArthur recognized the need for cryptologic support, thus, on 15 April 1942, he established the Central Bureau (CB), cobbling it together from refugee elements of American cryptologists evacuated from the Philippines, Australian cryptologists, and other Allied contingents. CB began in Melbourne, then moved to Brisbane.

In July 1942, by now Major Sinkov arrived in Melbourne as commander of the American detachment at Central Bureau. The Director of CB on paper was General Spencer B. Akin, MacArthur's chief signal officer, but General Akin in practice seldom visited the organization. He had worked with Sinkov in Washington and in Panama, and confidently left CB operations under his control.

Sinkov, who demonstrated strong organizational and leadership qualities in addition to his mathematics skills, brought this group of Americans and Australians—representing also different military services from their countries—into a cohesive unit. CB quickly became a trusted producer of Signals Intelligence (SIGINT) for MacArthur and his senior commanders. This SIGINT enabled consistent success in the air war against the Japanese and allowed MacArthur to win some stunning victories in the ground campaign in New Guinea and the Philippines.

=== Post-war ===
After the war, Sinkov rejoined SIS, now renamed the Army Security Agency, and, in 1949, when the Armed Forces Security Agency (AFSA)—the first centralized cryptologic organization in the United States—was formed, Sinkov became chief of the Communications Security program. He remained in this position as AFSA made the transition into the National Security Agency.

In 1954, Sinkov became the second NSA official to attend the National War College (the first was Louis Tordella). Upon his return, he became deputy director for production, effectively swapping jobs with his old colleague Frank Rowlett. Sinkov retired from NSA in 1962.

In 1966, he wrote Elementary Cryptanalysis: A Mathematical Approach, one of the first books on the subject, directed at high school students and available to the general public.

=== Retirement ===
Abraham Sinkov lived in retirement in Arizona after two careers, 32 years in NSA (and its predecessors), followed by an appointment as a professor of mathematics at Arizona State University.

== Hall of fame ==
Colonel Sinkov is a member of the Military Intelligence Hall of Fame.

== Books written ==
- Abraham Sinkov (1966), Elementary Cryptanalysis: A Mathematical Approach, Mathematical Association of America, Washington, D.C. ISBN 0-88385-622-0. 2nd edition, revised and updated by Todd Feil (2009), Mathematical Association of America, Washington, D.C. ISBN 978-0-88385-647-5 (print), ISBN 978-0-88385-937-7 (electronic).
