= Wireless Experimental Centre =

Coordinates: 28°41′8.6640″N 77°12′22.9788″E

The Wireless Experimental Centre (WEC) was one of two overseas outposts of Station X, Bletchley Park, the British signals analysis centre during World War II. The other outpost was the Far East Combined Bureau. Codebreakers Wilfred Noyce and Maurice Allen broke the Japanese Army's Water Transport Code here in 1943, the first high-level Japanese Army code broken. John Tiltman broke prewar Russian and Japanese codes at Simla and Abbottabad.

== Location and function ==
The WEC was located in Ramjas College (formerly part of the Delhi University campus), atop a hill called Anand Parbat "the hill of happiness" and was several miles out of Delhi and hence secure. Staff were from the Intelligence Corps, the British and Indian armies and the Royal Air Force. Section C under Colonel Marr-Johnson was a radio (wireless) intercept station and decoding section for Japanese codes. There were three outstations: the Wireless Experimental Depot in Abbottabad (where Russian (Soviet) transmissions were monitored in the interwar period), the Western Wireless sub centre at Bangalore and the Eastern Wireless sub centre at Barrackpore. There were also about 88 listening wireless sets around India, and several mobile Y-stations.

Work on BULBUL the IJA air-to-ground code which was first broken at Bletchley Park was transferred to the WEC as it provided valuable tactical information on Japanese air raids.

== Sections ==
Apart from Section C, the other four sections carried out administration, collating and evaluating signals intelligence, traffic analysis and radio interception. Colonel Aldridge headed the signals section, and had under his command No. 5 Wireless Detachment, Royal Corps of Signals.

== Peter Marr-Johnson ==
Lieutenant-Colonel Peter Marr-Johnson was the head of Section C of the Wireless Experimental Centre from 1943. He ran a successful but "too rigid" operation, with staff finding him distant and snobbish. He was a regular Army officer, having been commissioned in the Royal Artillery. He showed a talent in languages, and in 1932 with two other officers was sent to Japan as a language student. He received training in cryptography at GC&CS, and was in a Special Liaison Unit in Singapore and possibly Java (for Wavell). He was sent to Hong Kong in early 1939, and in 1939-40 (as a captain, then Major) was attached to the FECB in Hong Kong, where he objected to being under Admiralty control. He had little time for war-commissioned officers, referring to one who had been in business before the war as a "Bombay carpet-bagger".

== Maurice Allen ==
Maurice Allen was an Oxford Don who with Wilfrid Noyce broke the Water Transport Code in spring 1943 at the WEC, the first high-level Japanese Army code broken (at the WEC and also at Central Bureau in Melbourne).
