= Spencer B. Akin =

American Army general

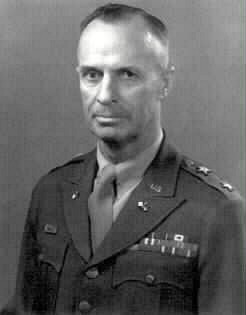
- Born: 13 February 1889; Greenville, Mississippi, U.S.
- Died: 6 October 1973 (aged 84) Leesburg, Virginia, U.S.
- Branch: United States Army
- Service years: 1910–1951
- Rank: Major General
- Commands: United States Army Signal Corps; Central Bureau
- Conflicts: World War I; World War II; Korean War
- Awards: Distinguished Service Cross; Distinguished Service Medal (2); Silver Star (2); Legion of Merit; Air Medal

Spencer Ball Akin (13 February 1889 – 6 October 1973) was a United States Army major general. During World War II, he served as the Chief Signal Officer, United States Army Forces in the Far East under General Douglas MacArthur. Akin later served as Chief Signal Officer, United States Army from 1947 to 1951.

== Early life and education ==
Akin was born and raised in Greenville, Mississippi. He attended the Virginia Military Institute, graduating in 1910. Akin later graduated from the Infantry School advanced course in 1926, the Command and General Staff School in 1928, and the Army War College in 1936. He returned to the Virginia Military Institute to complete a B.S. degree in civil engineering in 1933.

== Military career ==
Akin was commissioned as a second lieutenant of infantry in September 1910. Promoted to first lieutenant in July 1916 and captain in May 1917, he served as a temporary major from February 1918 to May 1920 during World War I.

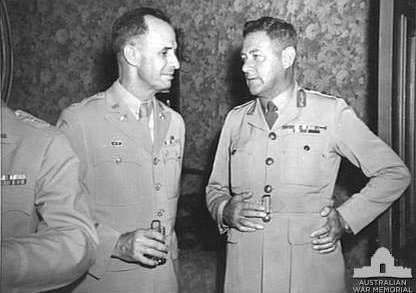
Australian Major General Colin Hall Simpson (right) with Major General Spencer B. Akin (left), the Chief Signal Officer at GHQ, March 1944.

In July 1920, Akin was permanently promoted to major and transferred to the Army Signal Corps. He was promoted to lieutenant colonel in August 1935 and colonel in August 1939.

Sent to the Philippines in 1941, Akin became chief signal officer under General MacArthur. He received a temporary promotion to brigadier general in December 1941. He was awarded the Distinguished Service Cross for his actions during the Japanese invasion of the Philippines, the citation for which reads:

The President of the United States of America, authorized by Act of Congress, July 9, 1918, takes pleasure in presenting the Distinguished Service Cross to Brigadier General Spencer Bell Akin, United States Army, for extraordinary heroism in connection with military operations against an armed enemy while serving as Chief Signal Officer, Pacific Forces, in action against enemy forces on 31 December 1941, in the vicinity of Santa Barbara, Pampanga, Philippine Islands. While returning from an inspection of Signal installations in Cuagua and Bucalor, conducted in the face of hostile aerial bombing and consequent oil and gasoline fires, and explosion of ammunition dumps en route, Brigadier General Akin was halted by a severe traffic congestion at a bridge on the Luboa-Leyac road in the vicinity of Santa Barbara. Despite the concentration of aerial bombs bursting in the congested area, this intrepid officer left his vehicle, walked to the center of the traffic block and proceeded, while under fire, to untangle and direct traffic until the normal flow was restored. By his courageous exploit, efficiently performed without regard for the serious personal hazards involved, the exodus of troops, civilians, guns and supplies to the south was expedited, and destruction of personnel and material incident to the concentrated bombing target presented by the extensive traffic block was minimized. Brigadier General Akin's intrepid actions, personal bravery and zealous devotion to duty exemplify the highest traditions of the military forces of the United States and reflect great credit upon himself, the Office of Strategic Services, and the United States Army.

He escaped with MacArthur from Corregidor to Australia in March 1942. There he became Chief Signal Officer, GHQ, Allied Forces in the Southwest Pacific Area and helped to establish Central Bureau to coordinate Allied signals intelligence. Akin also equipped a flotilla of small vessels like Argosy Lemal as radio relay stations.

Akin declined to remain behind a desk in Australia, earning one Silver Star during the December 1942 invasion of New Guinea and a second one in 1944. He received a temporary promotion to major general in November 1943. Akin was made an honorary commander of the Order of the British Empire in 1945.

After the war, Akin was reduced in rank to brigadier general in May 1946. On 1 April 1947, he became the Army's chief signal officer and received a permanent promotion to major general. Akin retired from active duty on 31 March 1951.

== Personal ==
Akin was the son of Seddon Pleasants Akin and Martha Giles (Chaffin) Akin.

Akin married Eleanor Holt Stone (30 September 1890 – 10 October 1959) on 15 June 1915. They had two daughters.

Akin and his wife settled in Purcellville, Virginia after his retirement. He died at Loudoun County Memorial Hospital in Leesburg. Akin and his wife are buried at Arlington National Cemetery.
