= Solomon Kullback =

American cryptanalyst and mathematician (1907–1994)

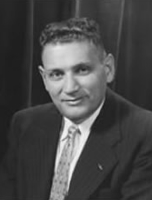
- Born: April 3, 1907; Brooklyn, New York, United States
- Died: August 5, 1994 (aged 87); Boynton Beach, Florida
- Education: City College of New York (B.A., 1927; M.A., 1929); George Washington University (Ph.D., Mathematics, 1934)
- Known for: Work in Information theory, Kullback–Leibler divergence
- Scientific career
- Fields: cryptanalysis, mathematics, information theory
- Workplaces: George Washington University, National Security Agency
- Doctoral advisor: Frank M. Weida
- Doctoral students: Hubert Lilliefors; Robert H. Shumway

Solomon Kullback (April 3, 1907 – August 5, 1994) was an American cryptanalyst and mathematician, who was one of the first three employees hired by William F. Friedman at the US Army's Signal Intelligence Service (SIS) in the 1930s, along with Frank Rowlett and Abraham Sinkov. He went on to a long and distinguished career at SIS and its eventual successor, the National Security Agency (NSA). Kullback was the Chief Scientist at the NSA until his retirement in 1962, whereupon he took a position at the George Washington University.

The Kullback–Leibler divergence is named after Kullback and Richard Leibler.

== Life and career ==
Kullback was born to Jewish parents in Brooklyn, New York. His father Nathan had been born in Vilna, Russian Empire, (now Vilnius, Lithuania) and had immigrated to the US as a young man circa 1905, and became a naturalized American in 1911. Kullback attended Boys High School in Brooklyn. He then went to City College of New York, graduating with a BA in 1927 and an MA in math in 1929. He completed a doctorate in math from George Washington University in 1934. His intention had been to teach, and he returned to Boy's High School to do so, but found it not to his taste; he discovered his real interest was using mathematics, not teaching it.

At the suggestion of Abraham Sinkov, who showed him a Civil Service flyer for "junior mathematicians" at US$2,000 per year, he took the examination. Both passed, and were assigned to Washington, D.C. as junior cryptanalysts.

Upon arrival in Washington, Kullback was assigned to William F. Friedman. Friedman had begun an intensive program of training in cryptology for his new civilian employees. For several summers running, the SIS cryptanalysts attended training camps at Fort Meade until they received commissions as reserve officers in the Army. Kullback and Sinkov took Friedman's admonitions on education seriously and spent the next several years attending night classes; both received their doctorates in mathematics. Afterward, Kullback rediscovered a love of teaching; he began offering evening classes in mathematics at George Washington University from 1939.

Once they had completed the training, the three were put to the work for which they had actually been hired, compilations of cipher or code material for the U.S. Army. Another task was to test commercial cipher devices which vendors wished to sell to the U.S. government.

Kullback worked in partnership with Frank Rowlett against RED cipher machine messages. Almost overnight, they unravelled the keying system and then the machine pattern – with nothing but the intercepted messages in hand. Using the talents of linguist John Hurt to translate text, SIS started issuing current intelligence to military decision-makers.

In May 1942, five months after attack on Pearl Harbor, Kullback, by then a Major, was sent to Britain. He learned at Bletchley Park that the British were producing intelligence of high quality by exploiting the Enigma machine. He also cooperated with the British in the solution of more conventional German codebook-based systems. Shortly after his return to the States, Kullback moved into the Japanese section as its chief.

When the National Security Agency (NSA) was formed in 1952, Rowlett became chief of cryptanalysis. The primary problem facing research and development in the post-war period was development of high-speed processing equipment. Kullback supervised a team of about 60 people, including such innovative thinkers in automated data processing development as Leo Rosen and Sam Snyder. His staff pioneered new forms of input and memory, such as magnetic tape and drum memory, and compilers to make machines truly "multi-purpose". Kullback gave priority to using computers to generate communications security (COMSEC) materials.

Kullback's book Information Theory and Statistics was published by John Wiley & Sons in 1959. The book was republished, with additions and corrections, by Dover Publications in 1968.

== Retirement ==
Solomon Kullback retired from NSA in 1962, and focused on his teaching at George Washington University and publishing new papers. In 1963 he was elected as a Fellow of the American Statistical Association. He reached the rank of colonel, and was inducted into the Military Intelligence Hall of Fame.

Kullback is remembered by his colleagues at NSA as straightforward; one described him as "totally guileless, you always knew where you stood with him." One former NSA senior recalled him as a man of unlimited energy and enthusiasm and a man whose judgment was usually "sound and right."
