= Leo Rosen =

American cryptanalyst

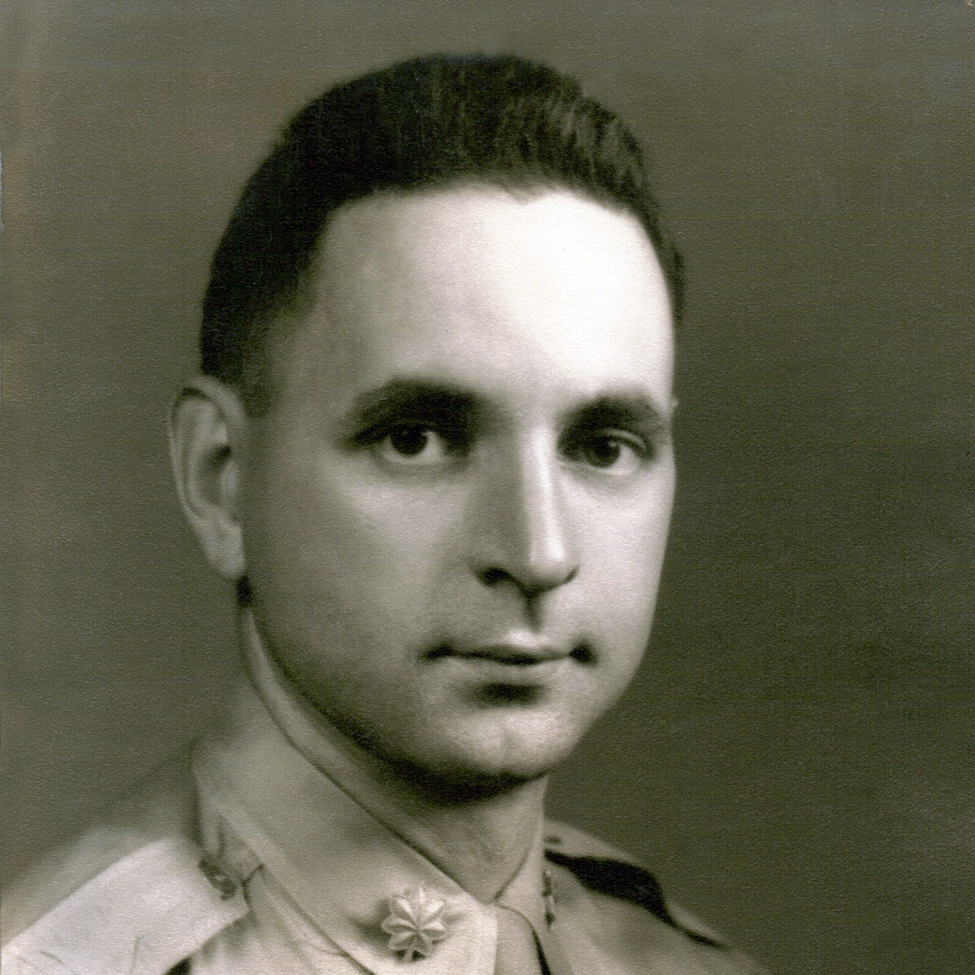
- Born: 26 March 1916; Woodbine, New Jersey
- Died: 16 March 1991 (aged 74); Arlington, Virginia
- Occupation: Cryptanalyst
- Known for: Cryptanalysis of PURPLE

Leo Rosen (26 March 1916 – 16 March 1991) was an American cryptanalyst who worked with Frank Rowlett at Signals Intelligence Service (S.I.S.) before the start of World War II on Japanese ciphers. Rowlett found a method to read the messages enciphered on the Japanese PURPLE machine. Rosen deduced correctly the mechanism of the cipher machine, even though the mechanism used by PURPLE, telephone stepping switches, was substantially different from other machines (such as the wired rotor and pinwheel machines).

Rosen was born in Woodbine, New Jersey, to Joseph Rosen and Catherine Shubina, emigrants from the Russian Empire.

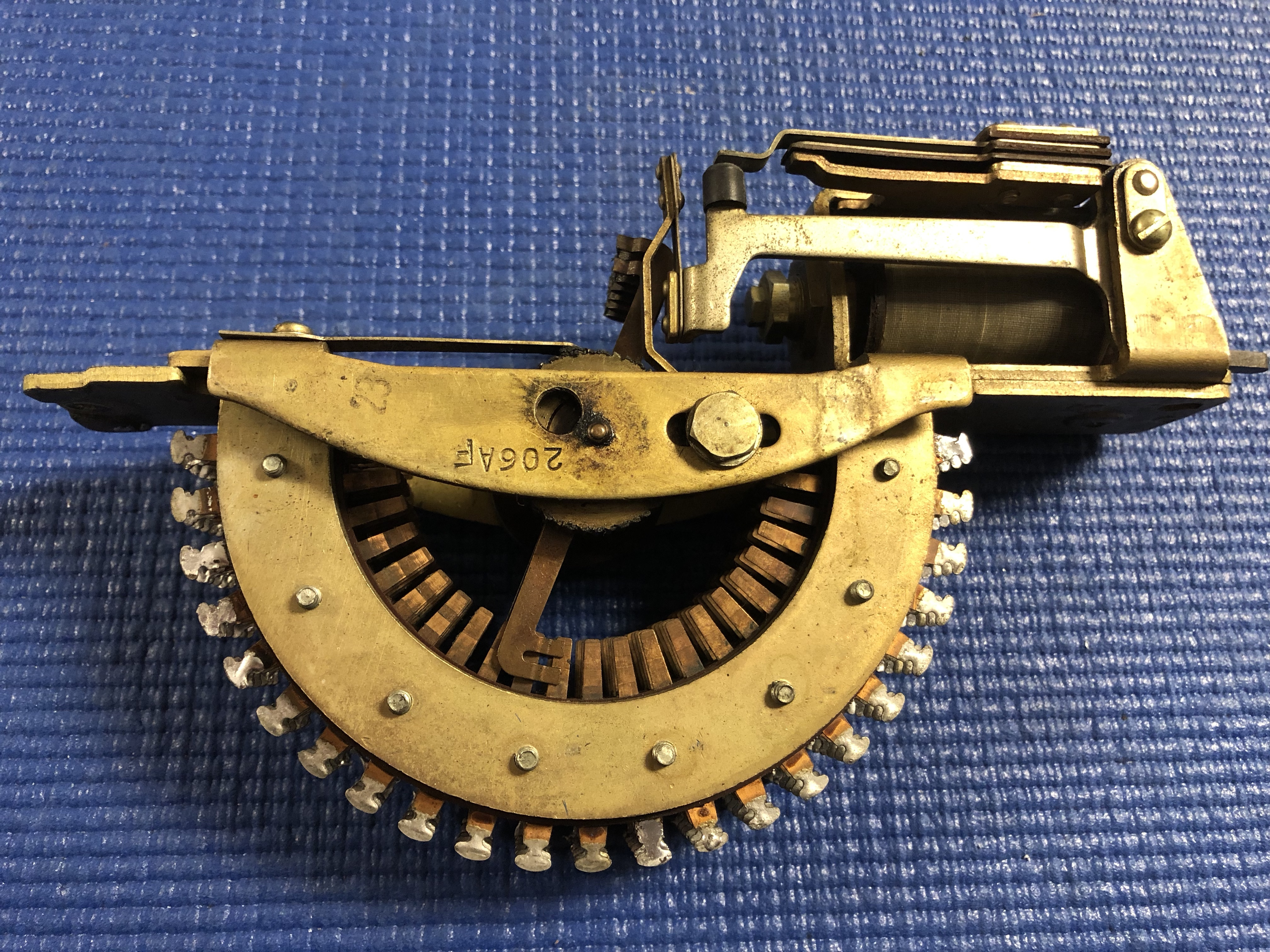
Stepping switch of the type used by Rosen to build an analog of the PURPLE machine

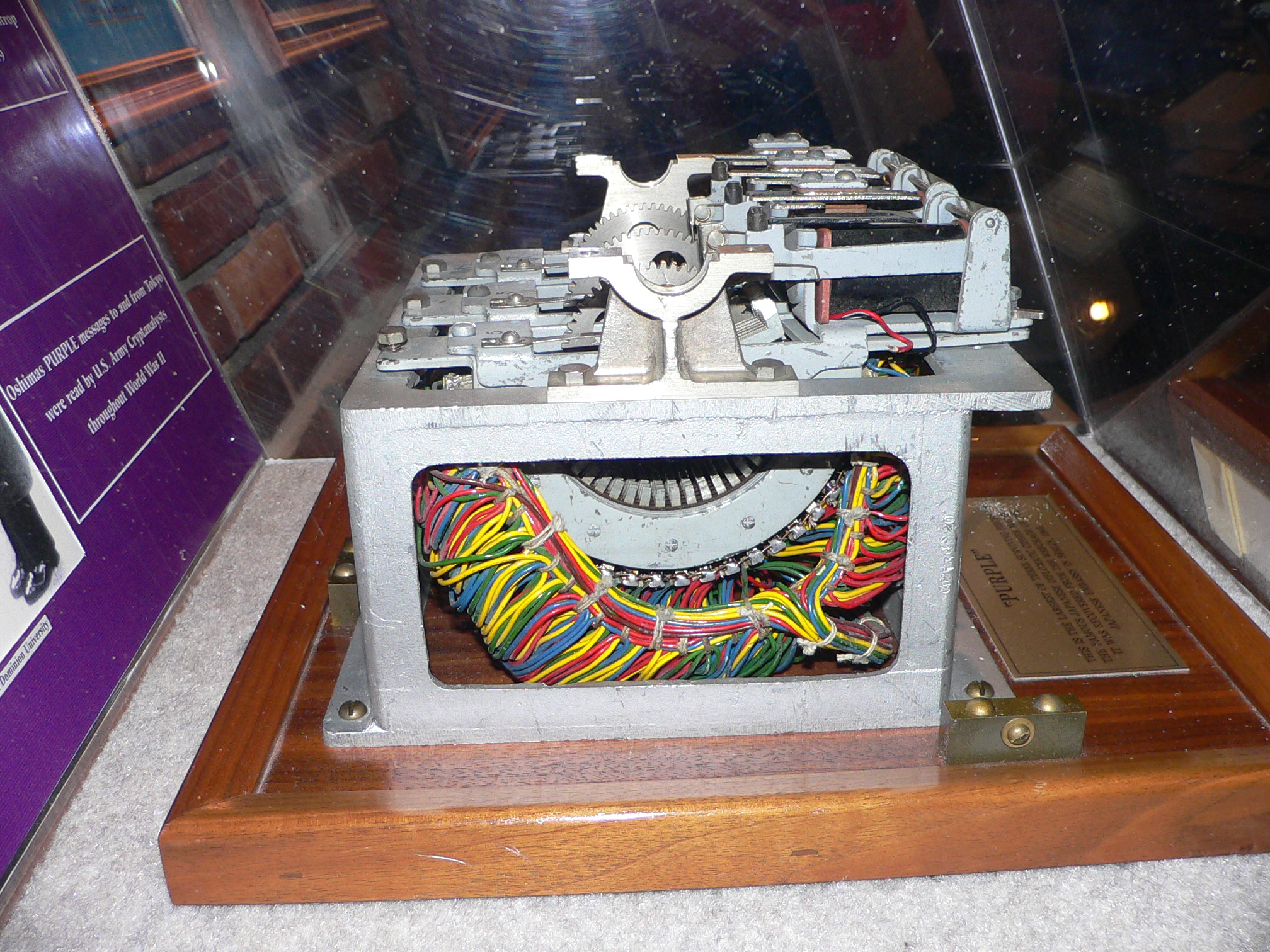
Fragment of a Japanese PURPLE machine recovered after the war. The Japanese used three 7-layer switches for each stage of the cipher; Rosen used four 6-layer switches per stage. Cryptographically, there was no difference.

Rosen built a replica of PURPLE which turned out (when a machine was found years later) to use stepping switches similar to those in common use at that time in the U.S. This machine was used to decode the Japanese diplomatic messages, sometimes before the Japanese ambassadors had themselves. Rosen also contributed his engineering talents during and after the war at Arlington Hall, after the S.I.S. became the Army Security Agency, later to become AFSA and finally the present National Security Agency.

He died in Arlington, Virginia, aged 71.

In 2010, he was posthumously inducted into the NSA Hall of Honor for his contributions to the cryptology world. He was represented by his son Lawrence Rosen and grandchildren Michael and Christine Rosen.

== See also ==
- John Tiltman
