= Signal Intelligence Service =

Codebreaking division of the United States Army during WW2

The Signal Intelligence Service (SIS) was the United States Army codebreaking division through World War II. It was founded in 1930 to compile codes for the Army. It was renamed the Signal Security Agency in 1943, and in September 1945, became the Army Security Agency. For most of the war it was headquartered at Arlington Hall (former campus of Arlington Hall Junior College for Women), on Arlington Boulevard in Arlington, Virginia, across the Potomac River from Washington D.C. During World War II, it became known as the Army Security Agency, and its resources were reassigned to the newly established National Security Agency (NSA).

== History ==
The Signal Intelligence Service was a part of the U.S. Army Signal Corps for most of World War II. At that time the Signal Corps was a bureau in the Headquarters, Department of the Army, in addition to being a branch of the Army to which personnel were commissioned or appointed. The Signal Corps supplied the Army with communications and photography equipment and services among other things. The Signal Corps also trained personnel and signal units for service with forces in the field. The evolution and activities of the Signal Intelligence Service before and during World War II is discussed in detail in Chapter XI, "Signal, Security, Intelligence," (pp. 327–350) in The Signal Corps: the Outcome, an official history of the Signal Corps.

Chapters 2 and 3 (pp. 4–25) in Army Field Manual FM 11-35, 1942, describe the organization of the Signal Intelligence Service in the War Department and in the forces in the field and the functions performed by SIS units. That manual was marked "RESTRICTED" when it was issued.

William Friedman began the division with three "junior cryptanalysts" in April 1930. Their names were Frank Rowlett, Abraham Sinkov, and Solomon Kullback. Before this, all three had been mathematics teachers and none had a cryptanalysis background. Friedman was a geneticist who developed his expertise in cryptology at George Fabyan's Riverbank Laboratories Cipher Department during 1915 to 1917, prior to World War I. Besides breaking foreign codes, they were responsible for just about anything to do with the U.S. Department of War's code systems. The SIS initially worked on an extremely limited budget, lacking the equipment it needed so that the analysts could intercept messages to practice decrypting.

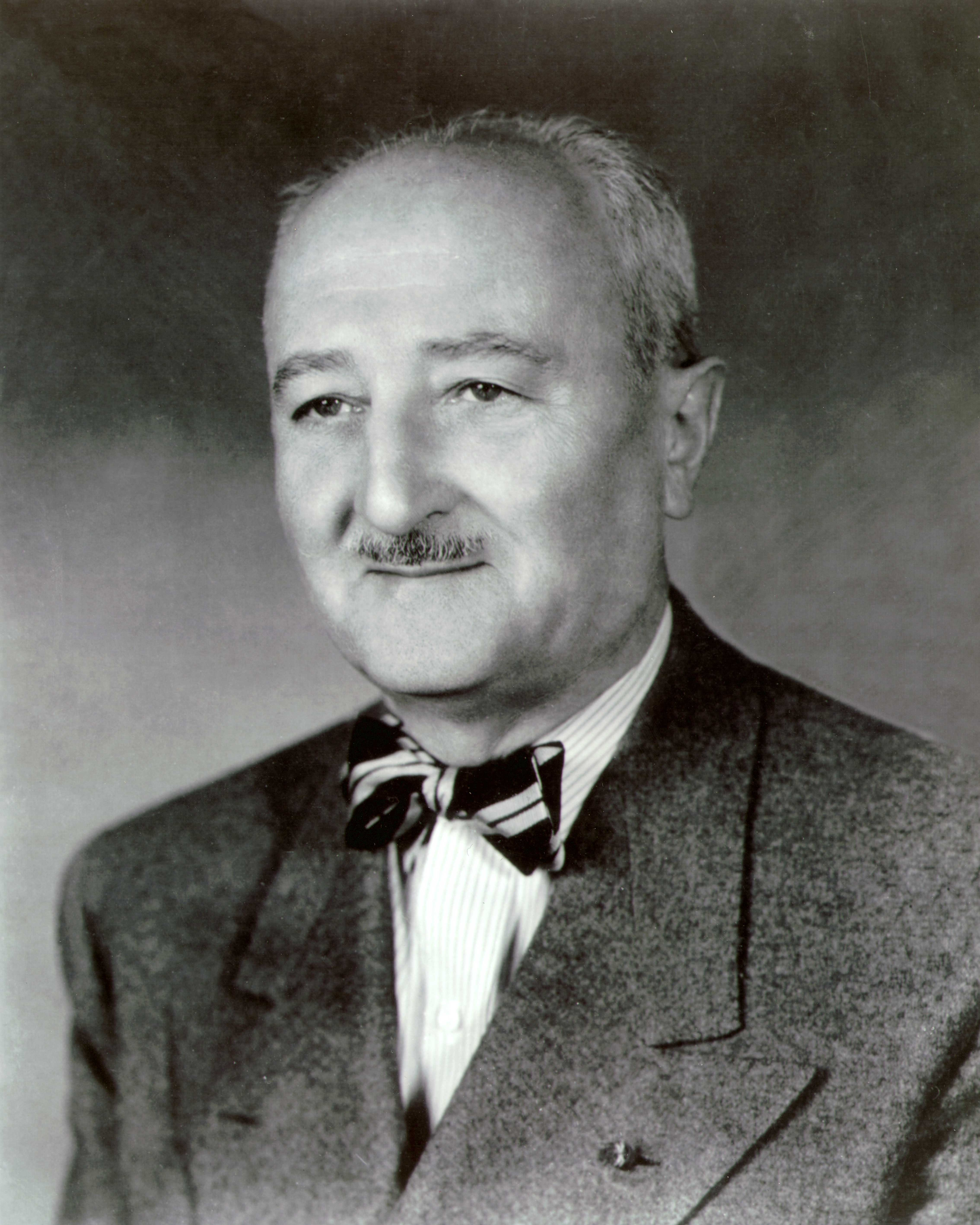
William Friedman (head of the SIS)

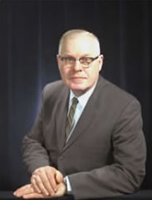
Frank Rowlett (junior cryptanalyst)

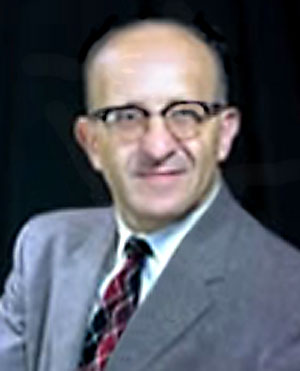
Abraham Sinkov (junior cryptanalyst)

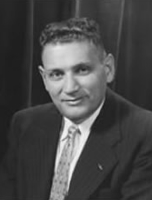
Solomon Kullback (junior cryptanalyst)

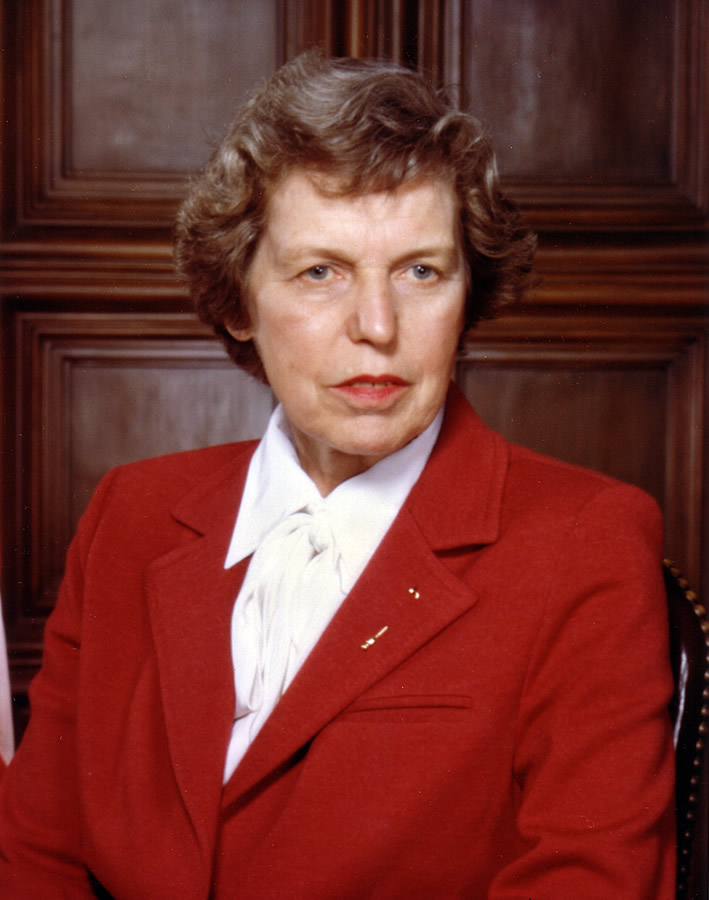
Ann Z. Caracristi (cryptanalyst)

The organization grew rapidly and organized efforts were made to recruit bright women. By the end of the war, most of the SIS staff, some 7,000 out of a total 10,500, were female. Ann Z. Caracristi, who would later become Deputy Director of the National Security Agency, started her career there and was a prolific breaker of Japanese army codes. The unit she worked in, largely staffed and led by women, produced a flow of intercepts from the "2468" shipping code system that resulted in the sinking of two-thirds of the Japanese merchant marine.

Midway through World War II, in 1943, the Army Signal Intelligence Service (later the Army Security Agency) began intercepting Soviet (Russian) intelligence traffic sent mainly from New York City; they assigned the code name "Venona" to the project. Although the United States had become allies with the Soviet Union in 1941, many officials were suspicious of the communist government and society. By 1945, some 200,000 messages had been transcribed, a measure of Soviet activity.

On 20 December 1946, after the war and at a time of increasing US tensions with the Soviet Union, Meredith Gardner made the first break into the Venona code. Decrypted messages revealed the existence of Soviet espionage at the Los Alamos National Laboratory work on the top-secret Manhattan Project, where the atomic bomb had been developed and research continued. The Venona project was so highly classified, however, that the government never introduced evidence from these messages into court proceedings in prosecution of alleged espionage agents.

== Intercept network ==
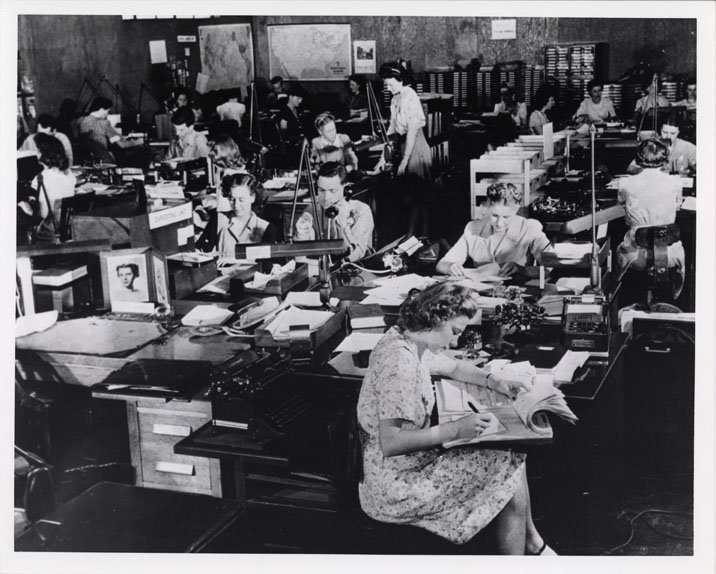
U.S. Army Signals Intelligence Service personnel at Arlington Hall (c. 1943)

The Army intercept network during WWII had six fixed stations, which concentrated on Japanese military signals and Axis diplomatic traffic.

- Vint Hill Farms Station, Warrenton, Virginia
- Two Rock Ranch, Petaluma, California
- Fort Shafter, Territory of Hawaii
- Fairbanks, Alaska
- New Delhi, India
- Asmara, Eritrea

== See also ==
- Signals intelligence
- OP-20-G
- United States Coast Guard Unit 387
- National Defence Radio Establishment
- Central Bureau
