= Frank Rowlett =

American cryptographer (1908–1998)

Frank B. Rowlett
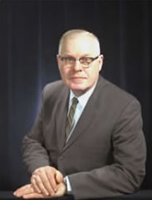
- Frank Rowlett.
- Born: May 2, 1908; Rose Hill, Lee County, Virginia, U.S.
- Died: June 29, 1998 (aged 90)
- Education: Emory & Henry College
- Awards: President's Award for Distinguished Federal Civilian Service (1965)
- Scientific career
- Fields: Cryptography

Frank Byron Rowlett (May 2, 1908 – June 29, 1998) was an American cryptologist.

== Life and career ==
Rowlett was born in Rose Hill, Lee County, Virginia and attended Emory & Henry College in Emory, Virginia. In 1929 he received a bachelor's degree in mathematics and chemistry. He was hired by William Friedman as a "junior cryptanalyst" for the Signals Intelligence Service (SIS) on April Fools' Day 1930; shortly after, he was followed into SIS by Abraham Sinkov and Solomon Kullback.

During the 1930s, after a lengthy period of training, Rowlett and his colleagues compiled codes and ciphers for use by the U.S. Army and began solving a number of foreign, notably Japanese, systems. In the mid-1930s, they solved the first Japanese machine for encipherment of diplomatic communications, known to the Americans as RED. In 1939–40, Rowlett led the SIS effort that solved a more sophisticated Japanese diplomatic machine cipher, codenamed PURPLE by the U.S. Once, when asked what his greatest contribution to that effort had been, Rowlett said, "I was the one who believed it could be done." Rowlett supervised cryptanalyst Virginia Dare Aderholdt, who decrypted the Japanese surrender message, August 14, 1945.

Rowlett also played a crucial role in protecting American communications during World War II, making fundamental and innovative contributions to the design of the SIGABA cipher machine. Its security was an important factor in saving American lives in combat. In 1964, Congress awarded Rowlett US$100,000, equivalent to $1,040,000 in 2025, as partial compensation for his classified cryptologic inventions.

In addition to having highly developed cryptanalytic skills, Rowlett was a good manager, and he rose quickly within the organization. In 1943–45 he was chief of the General Cryptanalytic Branch, and in 1945–1947 chief of the Intelligence Division. From 1949 to 1952, he was technical director in the Office of Operations of the Armed Forces Security Agency, predecessor to the National Security Agency (NSA).

Rowlett differed with General Ralph J. Canine, the first director of NSA, over personnel movements, including his own. Acting on his differences, he transferred to the Central Intelligence Agency (CIA) in 1952 and worked there until 1958. At that time he returned to NSA as a Special Assistant to the Director. In 1965 Rowlett became commandant of the National Cryptologic School. In 1965, Rowlett was awarded the President's Award for Distinguished Federal Civilian Service. He retired from federal service in 1966. In 1965 he was awarded the National Security Medal by President Lyndon B. Johnson for his work on breaking the Japanese Purple cipher.

Rowlett has been inducted into the Military Intelligence Hall of Fame.

Because of his importance in the protection of American communications, the Information Systems Security Organization has named its highest award the Frank Byron Rowlett Award.

Frank Rowlett died June 29, 1998, at age 90.

== See also ==
- Operation Gold
- Leo Rosen
