= NSA Hall of Honor =

Memorial at the National Security Agency headquarters

Coordinates: 39.1148°N 76.7748°W

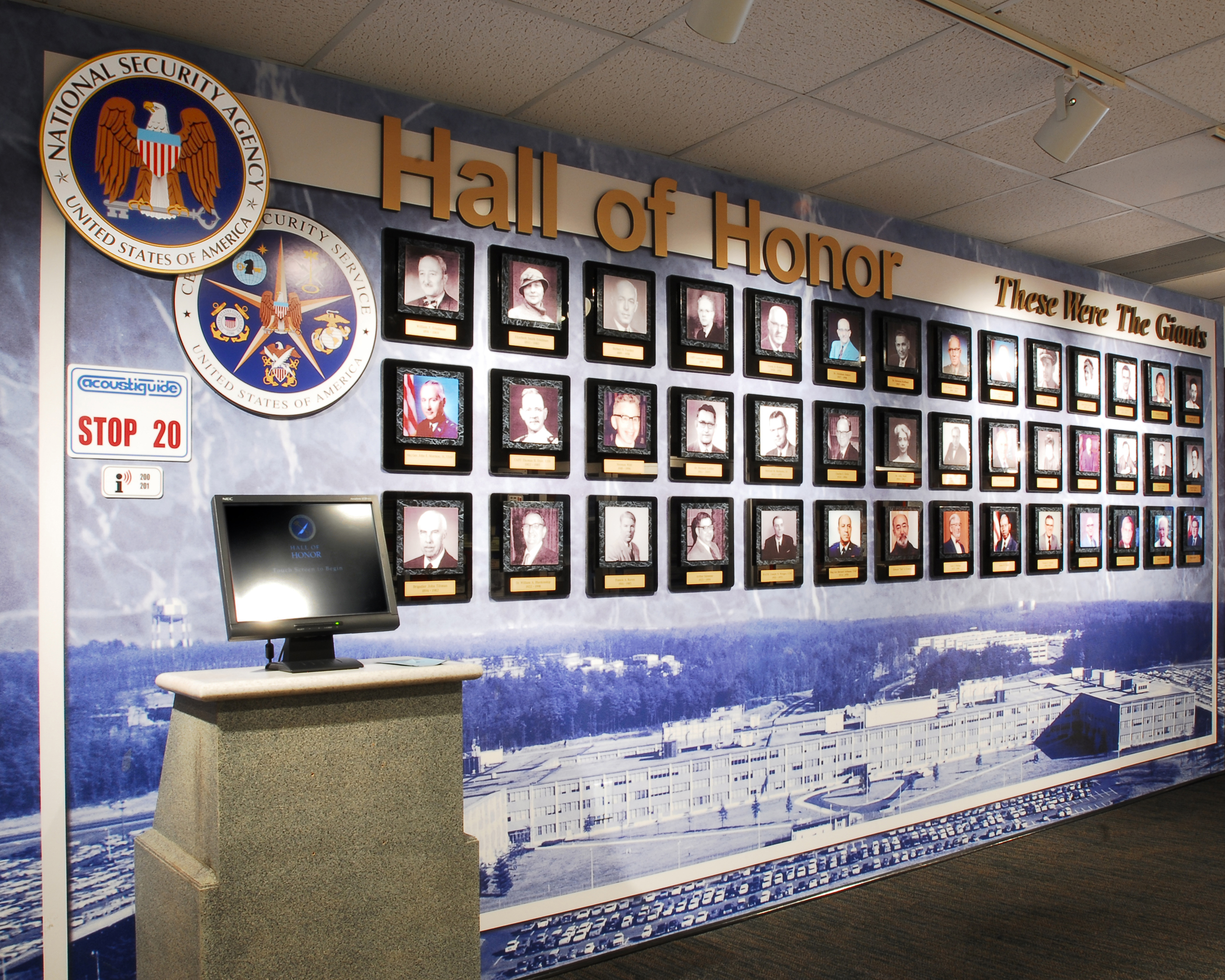
Wall at the NSA Hall of Honor

The Hall of Honor is a memorial at the National Security Agency headquarters in Fort Meade, Maryland. It honors individuals who rendered distinguished service to American cryptology.

== Criteria ==
The Hall of Honor is located on the grounds of the National Cryptologic Museum adjacent to NSA's headquarters in Ft. Meade, MD. Created in 1999, The standards are high for induction into the Hall of Honor. The individuals honored were innovators over their entire peers or made major contributions to the structure and processes of American cryptology.

== Inductees ==
Yearly, the National Cryptologic Museum Foundation recommends a slate of honorees to the National Security Agency for consideration along with nominees from other sources.

=== 2025 ===
- Edward Hebern
- Renee M. Meyer
- Robert D. Mueller
- James R. Schatz

=== 2024 ===
- Francis N. Allen
- Joanne B. Perriens
- James R. Child
- Patrick R. Gallagher Jr.
- Theodore Eric Nave

=== 2023 ===
- Evelyn Akeley
- James Lovell
- Major General Joseph Mauborgne
- James Radford
- Harry Rashbaum

=== 2022 ===
- Eunice Russel Willson Rice
- Youn P. (YP) Kim
- Richard "Dickie" George
- Robert Orestes Ferner

=== 2021 ===
- Joseph E. Gilligan, Jr.
- Jack C. Mortick
- Clifford Cocks, James H. Ellis, and Malcolm J. Williamson

=== 2020 ===
- George Cotter
- Whitfield Diffie
- David Kahn (writer)
- Barbara McNamara
- Lester Myers

=== 2019 ===
- Edward M. Drake
- Chief Radioman Harry Kidder, USN
- Colonel Alva Bryan Lasswell, USMC
- Lieutenant General Kenneth A. Minihan, USAF

=== 2018 ===
- Richard L. "Dick" Bernard
- Seymour R. Cray
- Michael J. Jacobs
- Hilda Faust Mathieu
- Whitney E. Reed

=== 2017 ===
- Mary H. "Polly" Budenbach
- Dennis M. Chiari
- Colonel Frank E. Herrelko, USAF
- Admiral Bobby Inman, USN
- Floyd L. Weakley

=== 2016 ===
- Gerald Hale
- Captain Leonard T. Jones, USCG
- Command Sergeant Major Odell Williams, USA

=== 2015 ===
- Ralph W. Adams, Jr.
- Charles R. Lord
- William O. Marks
- Robert J. McNelis
- Virginia Jenkins Riley

=== 2014 ===
- Frank C. Austin
- Walter Deeley
- Howard Ehret
- Marian Rejewski
- Alan Turing

=== 2013 ===
- Vera Ruth Filby
- Richard Proto
- Washington Wong
- Native American Code talkers

=== 2012 ===
- Ann Caracristi
- Robert E. Drake
- Ronald Hunt
- Juliana Mickwitz

=== 2011 ===
- William D. Coffee
- Joseph Desch
- Colonel Parker Hitt
- Laura Holmes

=== 2010 ===
- Joseph Amato
- David Boak
- Genevieve Grotjan Feinstein
- Leo Rosen

=== 2009 ===
- Richard A. Day Jr.
- Minnie M. Kenny
- Major general Doyle E. Larson
- Arthur Levenson

=== 2008 ===
- Benson K. Buffham
- Charles L. Gandy
- General Alfred M. Gray
- Oliver R. Kirby
- Rear Admiral Donald M. Showers

=== 2007 ===
- Jacob "Jack" Gurin
- Robert J. Hermann
- Samuel Simon Snyder
- Milton Zaslow

=== 2006 ===
- Brigadier General Bernard Ardisana
- Edward A. Everett
- Cecil J. Phillips
- James W. Pryde
- Thomas E. Tremain

=== 2005 ===
- William Blankinship
- Francis Raven
- Arthur J. Salemme
- Rear Admiral Joseph N. Wenger

=== 2004 ===
- Dorothy T. Blum
- James R. Chiles
- Meredith Gardner
- Brigadier General John Tiltman

=== 2003 ===
- Lambros D. Callimahos
- Lowell K. Frazer
- Juanita Moody
- Howard E. Rosenblum

=== 2002 ===
- Captain Thomas H. Dyer
- Norman Wild
- Richard A. Leibler
- Mitford M. Mathews
- Charles C. Tevis
- Julia Ward

=== 2001 ===
- Howard C. Barlow
- Mahlon E. Doyle
- Sydney Jaffe
- Major General John E. Morrison

=== 2000 ===
- Louis W. Tordella
- Captain Joseph Rochefort
- Agnes Meyer Driscoll

=== 1999 ===
- William F. Friedman
- Elizebeth Friedman
- Herbert Yardley
- Captain Laurance Safford
- Frank Rowlett
- Abraham Sinkov
- Solomon Kullback
- Lieutenant General Ralph Canine

== See also ==
- National Security Agency/Central Security Service Cryptologic Memorial
- CIA Memorial Wall
- Military Intelligence Hall of Fame
- National Security Agency
- National Cryptologic Museum
