= Parker Hitt =

American cryptographer

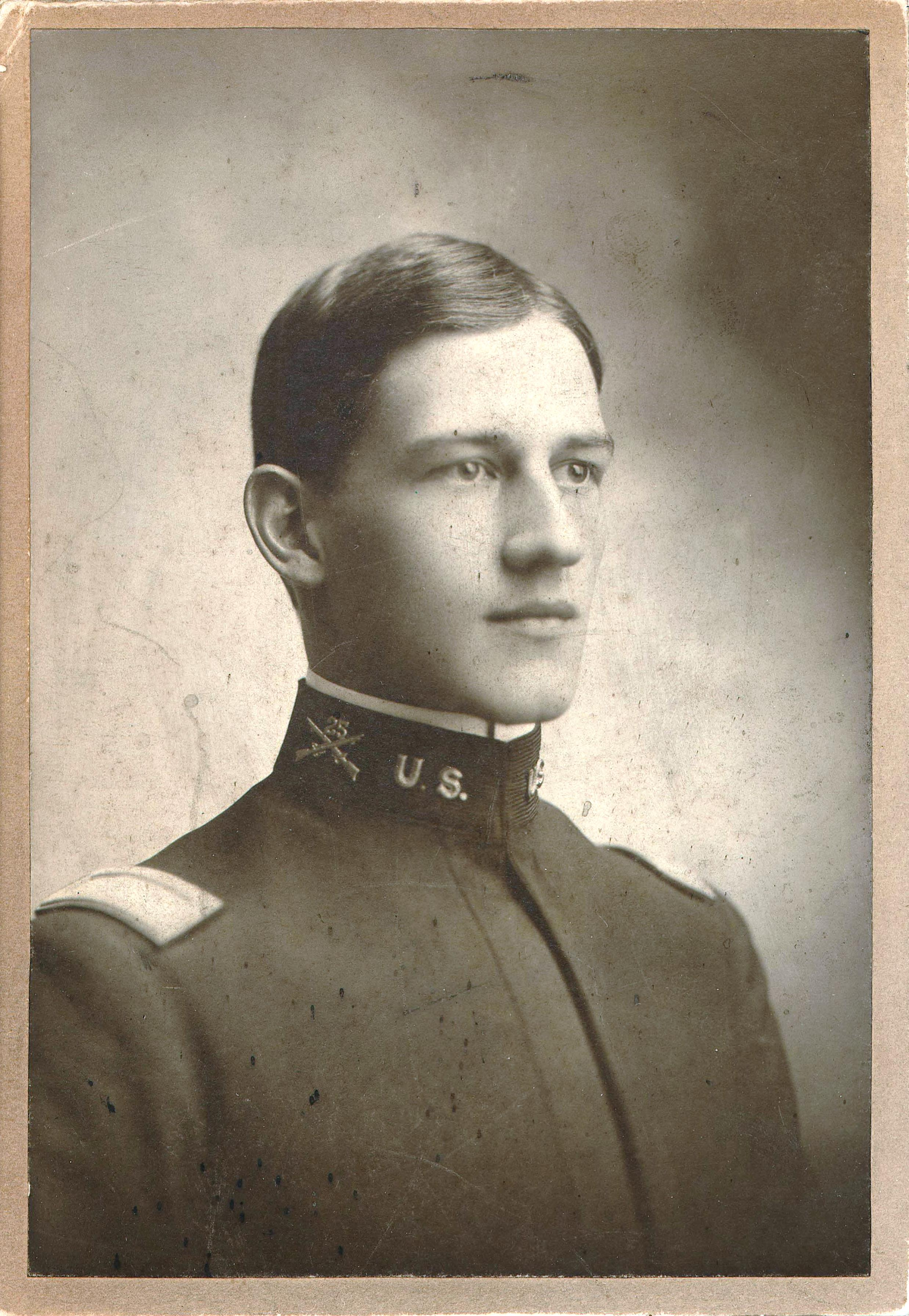
- Hitt in 1898
- Born: August 27, 1878; Indianapolis, Indiana, U.S.
- Died: March 2, 1971 (aged 92); Front Royal, Virginia, U.S.
- Burial place: Arlington National Cemetery
- Spouse: Genevieve Young Hitt (m. 1911)
- Children: Mary Lueise Hitt
- Military career
- Allegiance: United States
- Branch: United States Army
- Service years: 1898–1928, 1940–1944
- Rank: Colonel
- Nickname: "The Father of Modern American Military Cryptology"
- Commands: Chief Signal Officer, First Army (WWI)
- Conflicts: Spanish–American War; Philippine–American War; Pancho Villa Expedition; World War I World War II
- Awards: Military Intelligence Hall of Fame (1988); NSA Hall of Honor (2011)

Colonel Parker Hitt (August 27, 1878 – March 2, 1971) was a United States Army officer and a pioneer in the field of cryptology. Often cited as the "father of modern American military cryptology," Hitt authored the first practical work on military ciphers in the United States in over a century and invented foundational cryptographic devices that remained in use through World War II.

== Early life and education ==
Parker Hitt was born in Indianapolis, Indiana, on August 27, 1878. He attended Purdue University to study civil engineering but dropped out during his senior year in 1898 to enlist for service in the Spanish–American War. He served as a sergeant in the 2nd U.S. Volunteer Engineers in Cuba before being commissioned as a second lieutenant in the 22nd Infantry in 1899.

== Military career ==
Hitt's early military career included postings in the Philippines, California, and Alaska. In 1911, he attended the Signal Corps School at Fort Leavenworth, where his technical aptitude led to an appointment as an instructor. Between 1912 and 1915, he taught courses on codes, ciphers, and radio theory, significantly influencing the Army's communication doctrine.

During the Punitive Expedition in 1916, Hitt and his wife, Genevieve Young Hitt, solved intercepted Mexican government communications. Following the U.S. entry into World War I, General John J. Pershing selected Hitt for his staff in the American Expeditionary Forces (AEF). Hitt served as a Senior Signal Officer, overseeing the development of the "Radio Service Code" and supervising the coding and decoding of all AEF messages until a permanent headquarters was established in Paris. He was also instrumental in the employment of American female telephone operators, popularly known as the "Hello Girls," to manage switchboards for the First Army.

Hitt retired as a colonel in 1928 but was recalled to active duty in 1940 at the age of 62. During World War II, he served as the Signal Officer for the Fifth Corps Area at Fort Hayes, Ohio, until his final retirement in 1944.

== Contributions to American cryptology ==
Hitt is credited with modernizing American cryptanalysis through his teaching and inventions. He famously stated that success in cryptanalysis relied on four factors: "perseverance, careful methods of analysis, intuition, and luck."

=== Manual for the Solution of Military Ciphers ===
In 1916, Hitt published his seminal work, Manual for the Solution of Military Ciphers. It was the first practical U.S. instructional text on cryptanalysis in a century. The manual provided the foundation for training American cryptologists during World War I and was cited by William F. Friedman as the work that "launched" his career in the science.

=== Inventions ===
Finding the official Army field cipher insecure, Hitt proposed mechanical alternatives:

- The Cylinder Cipher: In 1912, Hitt built a prototype cylindrical device. This design was later refined by Major Joseph Mauborgne into the M-94, which the Army adopted in 1922 and used for over two decades.
- The Sliding Strip Cipher: Hitt developed a flat version of the cylinder device using alphabetic strips. This evolved into the M-138-A, used extensively by the State Department and U.S. Navy during the 1930s and World War II.

While working for IT&T in the 1930s, Hitt invented a teletypewriter cipher machine. Legally obtained details of his scrambler design were reportedly utilized by the German Lorenz Company to develop the Lorenz SZ (Tunny) machine used by Germany in World War II.

== Personal life ==
In 1911, Hitt married Genevieve Young Hitt. Genevieve became the first woman to break ciphers for the U.S. government while working as a paid codebreaker for the Army's Southern Department. Their daughter, Mary Lueise Hitt, also served as a "code girl" and teleprinter operator during World War II.

Hitt spent his final years on a farm in Front Royal, Virginia, where he raised dogs. He died on March 2, 1971, at the age of 92. His daughter recalled his modest final words as, "I should have had more dogs."

== Legacy ==
Hitt was posthumously inducted into the Military Intelligence Hall of Fame in 1988 and the NSA/CSS Cryptologic Hall of Honor in 2011. Hitt Hall at Fort Huachuca was named in his honor in 1995. During the 1930s, he was a key mentor to the American Cryptogram Association (ACA), providing technical advice to authors like Helen Fouché Gaines.
