= Richard Proto =

Richard C. Proto (February 9, 1940 – July 27, 2008) was a noted American cryptographer and former Director of Research and Advanced Technology at the United States National Security Agency. He was elected to NSA Hall of Honor in 2013.

== Early life ==
Proto was born and Fair Haven section of New Haven, Connecticut and graduated from Wilbur Cross High School in 1958, where he was a member of 1958 team that won the New England High School basketball championship in the Boston Garden. Proto then received his bachelor's degree in mathematics from Fairfield University in 1962, and his master's degree in mathematics from Boston College in 1964.

== Cryptography career ==
Proto joined the United States National Security Agency ("NSA") in 1964 as a cryptologic mathematician in the Communications Security Research & Development organization. He then dedicated the next thirty-five years to the NSA where he served in key roles in the research organization and the operational side of information security, he worked in security component design, security system architectures, vulnerability finding, and risk management. Proto eventually served as the NSA Director of Research and Advanced Technology from 1994 to 1999.

Proto is credited with creating the NSA Applied Mathematics Program to train mathematicians to apply their knowledge to a range of problems beyond the traditional cryptologic mission. He also created the Laboratory for Telecommunications Sciences to focus resources on mastering network technology. Proto authored 28 technical papers at NSA and was responsible for the invention of several information security devices, two of which were patented in his name.

== Awards ==
During his career, Proto received the Presidential Rank Award for Distinguished Service and the National Intelligence Distinguished Service Medal. In 2009, Proto was recognized by the NSA with the naming of the Richard C. Proto Symposium Center within the NSA compound at Fort George G. Meade in Maryland. It is only the second time the NSA has formally named one of its facilities. In 2013, Proto was elected to NSA Hall of Honor in 2013 for distinguished service to American cryptology.
