= Laura Holmes =

American cryptanalyst (1932–2016)

Laura Wason Holmes
- Born: March 2, 1932
- Died: March 7, 2016 (aged 84); Maddox, Maryland
- Burial place: All Saints Episcopal Church Cemetery, Oakley
- Occupation: Cryptanalyst
- Employer: National Security Agency (NSA)

Laura Holmes (1932–2016) was a career cryptanalyst and a 2011 Inductee into the NSA Hall of Honor.

== Biography ==
Holmes was born to Leonard Locke Holmes, Sr. and Dorothy Pogue Holmes and graduated in 1948 from the Margaret Brent High School. She joined the National Security Agency (NSA) where, for more than four decades, she worked at Fort Meade, Maryland as a cryptanalyst and supervisor.

=== Career ===
During the 1980s, her work did in cryptographic code, including against a series of challenging manual cryptosystems, allowed Holmes to build an impressive range of expertise in a variety of target languages.

At Fort Meade, she analyzed many dozens of manual systems from many targets and became notable because none of them were monoalphabetic (called a substitution cipher) and each required the cryptanalyst to discover a nontrivial trick, thus making de-coding particularly difficult. In addition, many of these codes were accompanied by only small quantities of traffic resulting in few examples to analyze. Holmes became known for tackling these challenges, and she showed an impressively high rate of success.

As a cryptanalysis teacher and supervisor, Holmes passed on to her students and interns her own pragmatic application of technique and knowledge. Using her extensive knowledge of both classic systems as well as modern variants, she was known for conveying "as much target knowledge as her interns could absorb." In addition, she passed on to her students her own accumulated knowledge of the target nations' current events, culture and military structure, all of which her students could find helpful in their cryptographic work. According to the NSA:

On at least one occasion she was instrumental in re-establishing the ability to work against a long-dormant analytic problem. Her memory for facets of different systems was legendary, and she was meticulous in preserving the knowledge she had gained by analysis.

Holmes reportedly said, when asked about her codebreaking success, that there was:

“Nothing miraculous about it. I spent two years learning to speak Russian, two years learning to think Russian, two years learning to understand what experience, what arrogance, and what hubris they would bring to bear, and then I spent the rest of my career waiting for them to do that.”

=== Hall of Fame induction ===
In 2011, Holmes was inducted into the NSA/Central Security Service Hall of Honor which acknowledges the contributions of "pioneers and heroes who have rendered distinguished service to American cryptology." Her induction included a summary of her contribution.

A career cryptanalyst who inspired and motivated her students and colleagues with her patience and persistence in solving some of the most difficult cryptanalytic problems in the late 20th century. Her remarkable qualities and legendary ability to remember facets of different systems were often the difference between success and failure.

Holmes died on March 7, 2016, in Maddox, Maryland and was buried in All Saints Episcopal Church Cemetery, Oakley.
