= Robert E. Rich =

American intelligence official (1926–2025)

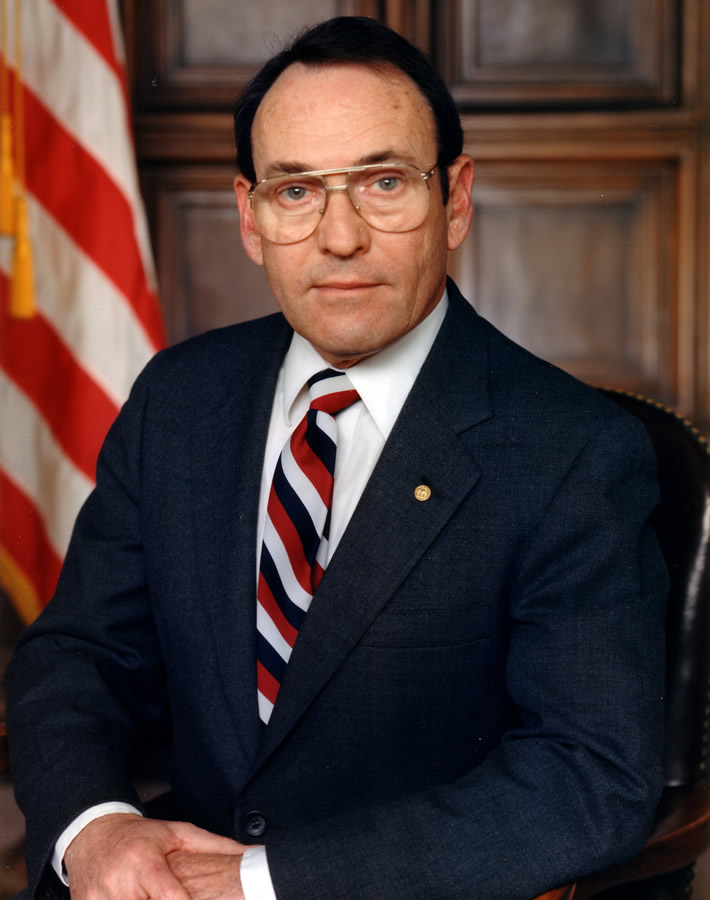

10th Deputy Director of the National Security Agency
- In office 31 July 1982 – 3 July 1986
- Preceded by: Ann Z. Caracristi
- Succeeded by: Charles R. Lord

Personal details
- Born: Robert Ellett Rich; December 15, 1926 Washington, D.C., U.S.
- Died: September 21, 2025 (aged 98) Olney, Maryland, U.S.
- Spouse: Kathleen Rich
- Profession: intelligence consultant and official

Robert Ellett Rich (December 15, 1926 – September 21, 2025) was an American intelligence official who was Deputy Director of the National Security Agency from 1982 to 1986 during which time he was the highest ranking civilian in the agency, working on internal management. He was also a "Far East expert".

== Life and career ==
Rich joined the NSA in 1962, after having worked in the Office of the Assistant to the Secretary of Defense for Special Operations. Prior to that he had worked in the Armed Forces Security Agency, starting in 1950, the NSA's predecessor.

During his time with the NSA he also served in the Japan office of the agency as well as the Special U.S. Liaison Officer, London. He is a recipient of the National Security Medal, in which he was presented with by President Ronald Reagan. From 1996 to 2003, he served as the President of the Board of Directors of the National Cryptological Museum Foundation.

Rich died in Olney, Maryland on September 21, 2025, at the age of 98.

Government offices
Preceded by Ann Z. Caracristi	Deputy Director of the National Security Agency; 1982–1986	Succeeded by Charles R. Lord
