= Deputy Director of the National Security Agency =

Chief operating officer of the National Security Agency

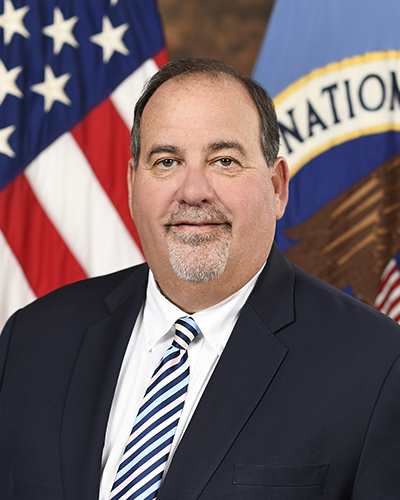
- Incumbent; Tim Kosiba since 9 January 2026
- Reports to: President of the United States
- Seat: Fort Meade, Maryland
- Appointer: President of the United States
- First holder: Joseph Wenger
- Succession: Current

The deputy director of the National Security Agency (DDIRNSA) is the highest-ranking civilian within the National Security Agency. As the senior civilian at NSA, the deputy director acts as the agency's chief operating officer, guiding and directing strategies and policy, and serves as the principal advisor to the director of the NSA. The deputy director reports to the NSA director and is required to be a technically experienced civilian.

== NSA deputy directors ==
=== Deputy directors of AFSA ===
The Armed Forces Security Agency (AFSA) was the predecessor to the NSA.

#	Deputy Director	Term
1*	Samuel P. Collins, USA; Joseph Wenger, USN; Roy H. Lynn, USAF	November 1950 – April 1951
2	Travis Hetherington, USAF	1951–1952

*From November 1950 to April 1951, there was a Deputy Director for each service.

=== Deputy directors of NSA ===
#	Vice Director	Term
1	Joseph Wenger	1952–1953
2	John Ackerman	1953–1956
3	John A. Samford	June 1956
#	Deputy Director	Term
4	Joseph H. Ream	1956–1957
5	Howard Engstrom	1957–1958
6	Louis W. Tordella	1958–1974
7	Benson K. Buffham	1974–1978
8	Robert E. Drake	1978–1980
9	Ann Z. Caracristi	1980–1982
10	Robert E. Rich	1982–1986
11	Charles R. Lord	1986–1988
12	Gerald R. Young	1988–1990
13	Robert L. Prestel	1990–1994
14	William P. Crowell	1994–1997
15	Barbara McNamara	1997–2000
16	William B. Black, Jr.	2000–2006
17	John C. Inglis	2006–2014
18	Richard Ledgett	2014–2017
19	George C. Barnes	2017–2023
20	Wendy Noble	2023–2025
–	Sheila Thomas (acting)	2025–2025
21	Tim Kosiba	2025-present
