= Sean Cairncross =

American lawyer

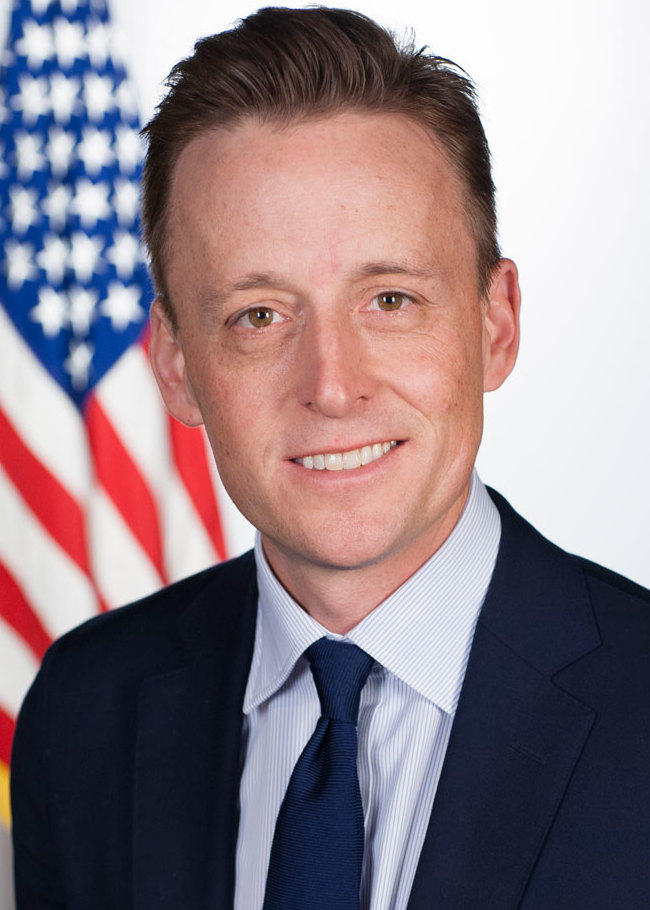
- Official portrait, 2018

United States National Cyber Director
- In office August 4, 2025 – November 19, 2026
- President: Donald Trump
- Preceded by: Harry Coker

Chief Executive Officer of the Millennium Challenge Corporation
- In office June 2019 – January 20, 2021
- President: Donald Trump
- Preceded by: Dana Hyde
- Succeeded by: Alice P. Albright

Personal details
- Party: Republican
- Education: New York University (JD)

Sean Cairncross is an American lawyer and political operative who served as the United States national cyber director from 2025 to 2026. Cairncross served as the chief executive officer of the Millennium Challenge Corporation from 2019 to 2021.

Cairncross served as the deputy counsel for the Republican National Committee, later becoming the committee's chief counsel. In 2013, he left the committee to become a partner at Holtzman Vogel Josefiak. By October 2015, Cairncross had become the chief operating officer of the Republican National Committee. After Donald Trump's first inauguration, he served as a deputy assistant to the president and the senior advisor to Reince Priebus, the White House chief of staff. Following Priebus's resignation, Cairncross remained within the White House in an unclear position.

In January 2018, Trump nominated Cairncross to serve as the chief executive officer of the Millennium Challenge Corporation. He was confirmed by the Senate in July 2019. Cairncross returned to the Republican National Committee in March 2024, serving as its chief operating officer. In February 2025, Trump nominated Cairncross to serve as the United States national cyber director. He was confirmed by the Senate in August. Cairncross was dismissed as the national cyber director in November 2026.

== Early life and education ==
Sean Cairncross graduated from the New York University School of Law in 2001.

== Career ==
=== Republican legal work (2006–2015) ===
By March 2006, Cairncross had become a deputy counsel for the Republican National Committee. He advised a deputy to the Arizona secretary of state that the state could require proof of U.S. citizenship for new voters, going against a ruling by the Election Assistance Commission. Cairncross had become the chief counsel by April 2008. In February 2009, John Cornyn, the chairman of the National Republican Senatorial Committee, announced that he had appointed Cairncross to lead the committee's legal affairs. Cairncross was involved in litigation in preparation for the results of the 2010 Senate special election in Massachusetts. In June 2010, he authored a memorandum telling staffers not to accost videographers after reports of confrontations between videographers and the Democratic politicians Bob Etheridge and Alexi Giannoulias emerged. In the Republican primary for that year's 2010 Senate election in Alaska, Cairncross assisted Murkowski as ballots were cast and after her loss to Joe Miller. According to The Huffington Post, Cairncross wrote Massachusetts senator Scott Brown's letter to Elizabeth Warren offering a mutual pledge not to accept third-party advertising in the 2012 Senate election in the state. In June 2013, Cairncross joined Holtzman Vogel Josefiak as a partner.

=== Chief operating officer of the Republican National Committee (2015–2017) ===
By October 2015, Cairncross had become the chief operating officer of the Republican National Committee. In November, the committee's chief of staff, Katie Walsh, appointed Cairncross to negotiate with networks over the 2016 Republican Party presidential debates and forums and to work with Sean Spicer, the committee's communications director; the decision occurred after several campaigns criticized the format of CNBC's Republican debate several days earlier. In February 2016, Cairncross wrote in a memorandum that Donald Trump's claims that the committee was selling debate tickets to donors and lobbyists was false. He participated in several private meetings in an effort to stop Trump from becoming the Republican Party's nominee in the 2016 presidential primaries. In April 2016, Trump met with several Republican National Committee officials, including Cairncross, at its headquarters to improve relations between the committee and his campaign.

=== Senior advisor to Reince Priebus (2017–2018) ===
One day prior to Donald Trump's first inauguration, his transition team announced that Cairncross would serve as a deputy assistant to the president and senior adviser to Reince Priebus, Trump's appointee to serve as the White House chief of staff. After Priebus resigned in July 2017, Cairncross's responsibilities remained unclear. He continued to work for the White House after John F. Kelly succeeded Priebus. Cairncross had left the White House by July 2018.

=== Chief Executive Officer of the Millennium Challenge Corporation (2019–2021) ===
On January 6, 2018, Donald Trump named Cairncross as his nominee to serve as the chief executive officer of the Millennium Challenge Corporation. Cairncross appeared before the Senate Committee on Foreign Relations the following months. Amid concerns that the Trump administration was politicizing the Millennium Challenge Corporation, Cairncross told Oregon senator Jeff Merkley that he was unaware of the administration's efforts to control the hiring at the corporation. The Senate invoked cloture on Cairncross's nomination in June 2019.

=== Post-government work (2021–2024) ===
In July 2022, Cairncross became a senior visiting fellow at the Krach Institute for Tech Diplomacy at Purdue University. By that year, he had established the Cairncross Group, a consulting firm that received contracts from the Republican National Committee. In March 2024, Chris LaCivita, the chief operating officer of the Republican National Committee, hired Cairncross to cut excess spending at the committee. Cairncross succeeded LaCivita as the chief operating officer.

=== National Cyber Director (2025–2026) ===
On February 11, 2025, Donald Trump nominated Cairncross to serve as the United States national cyber director. Cairncross appeared before the Senate Committee on Homeland Security and Governmental Affairs on June 2. His nomination garnered skepticism from some Democrats on the committee, who noted his lack of cybersecurity experience. The committee voted to advance Cairncross's nomination on June 30. The Senate voted to confirm Cairncross in a 59–35 vote on August 2. He was sworn in two days later.

As the national cyber director, Cairncross established a cybersecurity strategy in which the United States would coordinate with allies in responding to nation-state adversaries. At the Aspen Cyber Summit, he stated that the United States needed to send a message that cyberattacks are "not consequence-free". Cairncross led the Trump administration's response to the impending release of powerful artificial intelligence models, including Claude Mythos. He sought to control access to Mythos and to negotiate its availability to civilian agencies. Several U.S. officials expressed opinions that Cairncross did not have the sufficient experience and lacked urgency in responding to threats from artificial intelligence.

On November 19, 2026, Cairncross was dismissed as the national cyber director. According to Axios, Cairncross was fired by Stephen Miller, the White House chief of staff, for not having "the strong cyber credentials to perform the job."
