= Richard Ledgett =

Deputy Director of the NSA

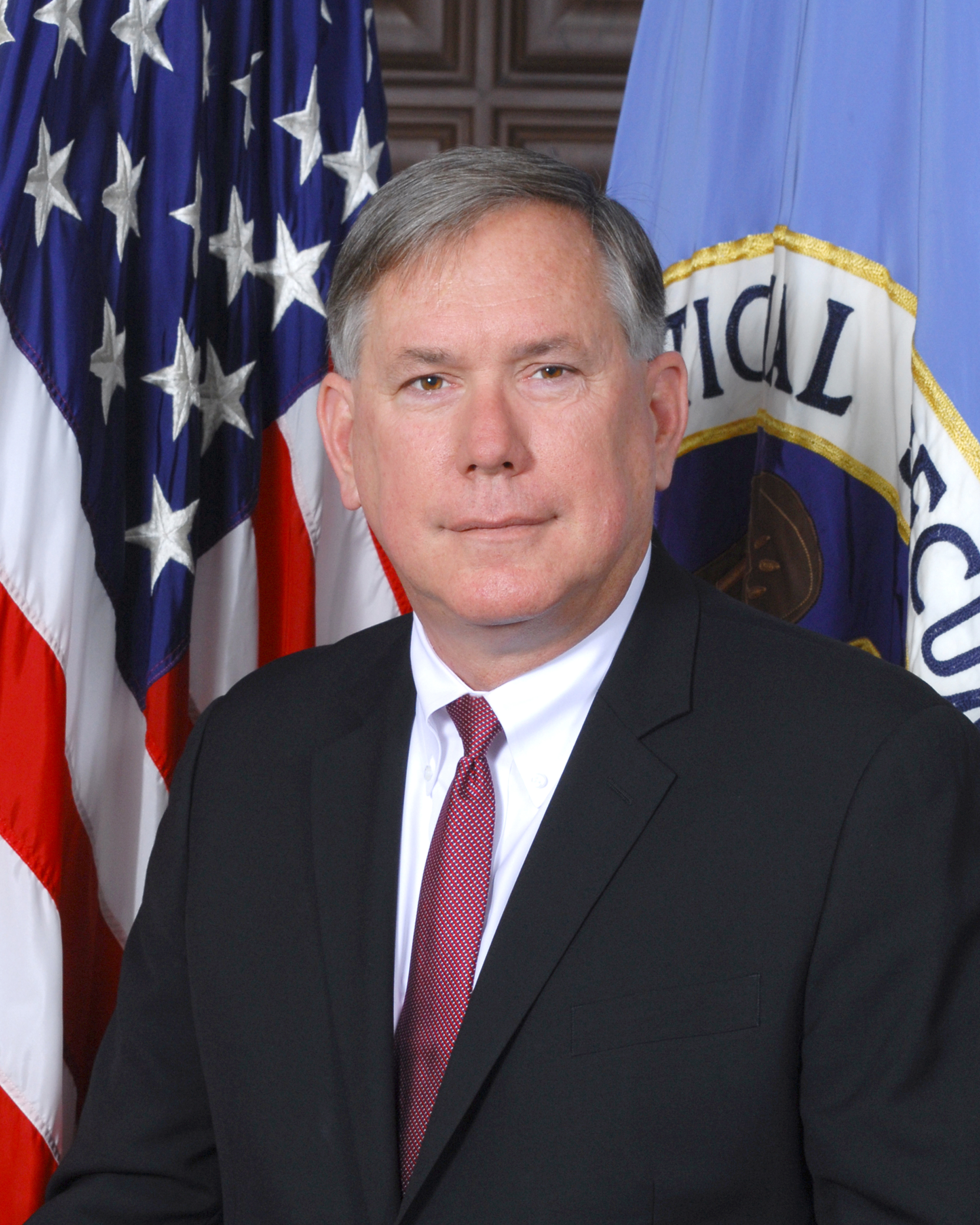

18th Deputy Director of the National Security Agency
- In office 2014–2017
- President: Barack Obama; Donald Trump
- Preceded by: John C. Inglis
- Succeeded by: George C. Barnes

Military service
- Allegiance: United States
- Branch/service: United States Army
- Unit: Signals Intelligence

Richard H. Ledgett Jr. is a former Deputy Director of the National Security Agency.

== Education ==
Ledgett has an undergraduate degree in psychology and a graduate degree in strategic intelligence.

== Career ==
In 1988, he began working for the National Security Agency, where he served in a variety of positions in the cybersecurity division.

Previous positions at NSA included Deputy Director for Analysis and Production (2009–2010), Deputy Director for Data Acquisition (2006–2009), Assistant Deputy Director for Data Acquisition (2005–2006), and Chief, NSA/CSS Pacific (2002–2005).

From 2012 to 2013 he was the Director of the NSA/CSS Threat Operations Center, responsible for round-the-clock cryptologic activities to discover and counter adversary cyber efforts.

From June 2013 to his appointment as Deputy Director in January 2014, Ledgett headed the investigation of the Snowden disclosures.

On February 3, 2017, Ledgett announced that he would be retiring in the spring. His successor was George C. Barnes.

On August 15, 2017, Ledgett was elected to M&T Bank Corporation's Board of Directors.

Ledgett was part of a group of former intelligence officials that signed a letter that stated the Biden laptop story “has the classic earmarks of a Russian information operation". It was in fact revealed the laptop contained no evidence of Russian disinformation, and portions of its contents have been verified as authentic. On January 20, 2025, Ledgett's security clearance was suspended.

=== Statements regarding NSA surveillance ===
Ledgett pledged increased transparency regarding NSA operations. He defended the operations of the NSA and argued in a rare interview with Reuters that NSA operations are completely legal. Ledgett also accused the media of sensationalizing reports about various NSA mass surveillance programs.

In March 2014, Ledgett stated during a TED Talk that the NSA operates legally. He further argued that President James Madison would be proud of the way in which Constitutional checks and balances have governed NSA mass surveillance.

== Awards and decorations ==
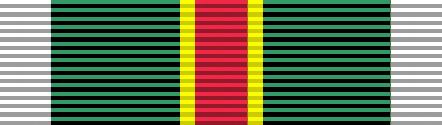
NSA Exceptional Civilian Service Medal
