= Juliana Mickwitz =

Translator, linguist and cryptanalyst

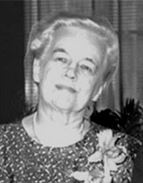
- Born: Juliane Charlotte Ernestine von Mickwitz; 15 May 1889; Vyborg, Grand Duchy of Finland, Russian Empire
- Died: 21 August 1976 (aged 87); Hyattsville, Maryland
- Other names: Juliana von Mickwitz
- Occupations: translator and cryptanalyst
- Years active: 1920-1966

Juliana Mickwitz (Russian: Юлиана Эрнестовна Миквиц) (1889–1976) was a Finnish-born Russian who became a naturalized American citizen. She was employed with the American military and later National Security Agency as a translator, linguist and cryptanalyst. She was inducted into the Cryptologic Hall of Honor in 2012.

== Early life ==
Juliane Charlotte Ernestine von Mickwitz was born to Elisabeth Marie Caroline (née von Dittmann) and Ernst Theodor Leopold von Mickwitz (aka Russian: Миквиц, Mikvits, Minckwitz) on 15 May 1889, Vyborg, Grand Duchy of Finland, Russian Empire, on her grandfather's estate called "Halila". She was the oldest of two children and her brother Alexander would later join her in the United States. After learning English, German and Russian at home with a tutor, she entered St Ann's Gymnasium in Saint Petersburg in 1903. She graduated with a gold medal of excellence in 1907 and tutored students until 1909.

In that year, she began working as a secretary to Michael Lazareff, president of the Russian Unified Oil Company, and continued working for his widow, Eugenia after Lazareff's death. In 1919, with the rise of the Bolsheviks during the Russian Civil War, Mickwitz managed to hide assets for Lazareff, who in turn, secured their passage to Poland under the story that Mickwitz was engaged to a Polish doctor.

On 15 April 1920, the two women arrived in Warsaw, and Mickwitz began trying to preserve the Lazareff assets outside of the Soviet Union and protect them from confiscation. She worked as a translator for various organizations including the American Consulate of Warsaw, the British Embassy and the Canadian US Timber Corporation, until 1925. In that year, she began working as a foreign correspondent with the Polish Agricultural Syndicate for the Kooprolna Cooperative. After a year, she applied for a full-time position with the American Military Attaché Office.

== Career ==
In 1926, Mickwitz became employed with the US Military Attaché office in Warsaw working with Major General William H. Colbern, Colonel R. I. McKenney, Colonel John Winslow, and General Emer Yeager. For thirteen years, she worked in Warsaw and then with the Nazi invasion of Poland in December 1939, she transferred with the rest of the office to The Hague, Netherlands taking Lazareff with her as her "aunt". After only a few months, when the Germans invaded the low countries, the office evacuated to Berlin for three months and then in August 1940 relocated to Athens. Once again the Germans followed and in July, 1941, Mickwitz and Lazareff fled to Lisbon. With the assistance of former employers, she was able to secure travel visas for the United States in March, 1942.

Arriving in the U.S., Mickwitz began working for the War Department in the Military Intelligence Directorate translating German, Polish and Russian documents. In October 1946, when she was released from service, she was awarded the Meritorious Civilian Service Medal. That same month, she was hired by the Army Security Agency and stationed at Arlington Hall. In 1952, she was transferred to the National Security Agency (NSA) and founded a linguistic unit, which she managed to translate plaintext voice. She remained with the agency until 1963, when she retired, receiving a second Meritorious Service Award, but continued to consult with NSA until 1966. She was inducted into the Cryptologic Hall of Honor in 2012.

== Personal notes ==
Mickwitz was a member of the Russian Orthodox Church and helped with the founding and construction of the Russian Orthodox Cathedral of St. John the Baptist, Washington DC. She served as head of the parish for many years and worked to establish the Congress of Russian Americans in Virginia, to help Russian immigrants. She became a naturalized American citizen.

Mickwitz died on 21 August 1976 at the Sacred Heart Nursing Home in Hyattsville, Maryland, after suffering a stroke the previous November. Her priest in Greece, Father Nicolas Pekatoros, officiated at her funeral.
