= Harry Coker =

American lawyer

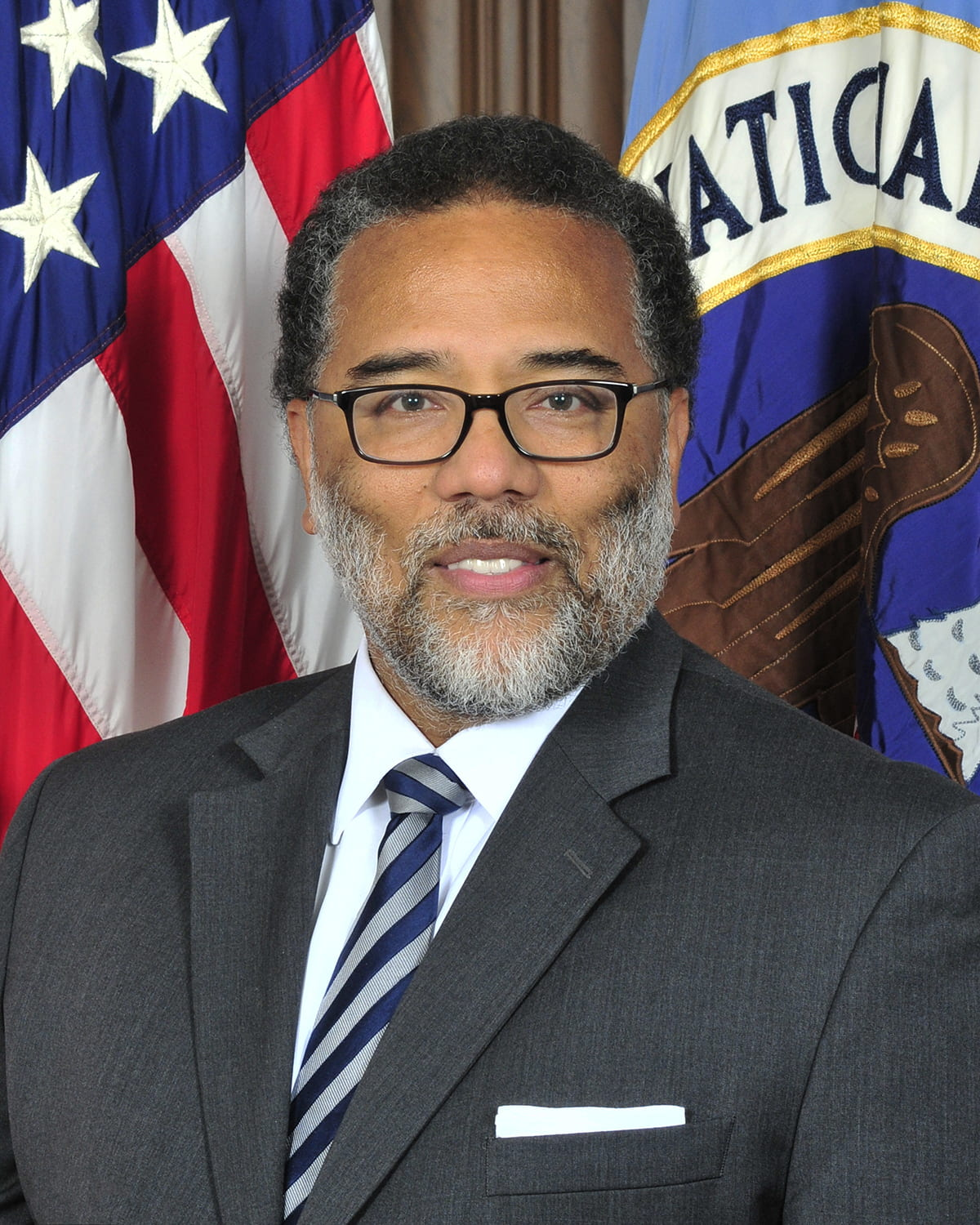

Secretary of the Maryland Department of Commerce
- Incumbent
- Assumed office February 28, 2025; Acting:February 5, 2025 – February 28, 2025
- Governor: Wes Moore
- Preceded by: Kevin Anderson

United States National Cyber Director
- In office December 15, 2023 – January 20, 2025
- President: Joe Biden
- Preceded by: Chris Inglis
- Succeeded by: Sean Cairncross

Personal details
- Education: United States Naval Academy (BS); Georgetown University (JD); Naval Postgraduate School (MS)

Harry Coker Jr. is an American lawyer and national security expert serving as the Maryland Secretary of Commerce since 2025. He previously served as National Cyber Director from 2023 to 2025 and as the executive director of the National Security Agency from 2017 to 2019.

From 2019 to 2023, Coker has worked as a senior fellow at the Auburn University McCrary Institute for Cyber and Critical Infrastructure Security. A graduate of the Naval Postgraduate School, Coker was a naval officer for twenty years before joining the Central Intelligence Agency in 2000.

== Education and Navy career ==
Coker graduated from the United States Naval Academy. He earned a J.D. from Georgetown University Law Center and attended the Naval Postgraduate School.

Coker served as a surface warfare officer for his first six years in the United States Navy and was an engineering duty officer until he retired as a Commander in 2000.

== Professional career ==
After leaving the Navy, Coker joined the Central Intelligence Agency (CIA). For seventeen years, he worked in the CIA Directorate for Digital Innovation, the Directorate of Science and Technology, and the Director's area. Coker was the director of the open source enterprise and served as the deputy director of the CIA office of public affairs. Coker served on the executives diversity and inclusion council (EDIC).

From 2017 to 2019, Coker was the executive director at the National Security Agency. In 2019, Coker became a senior fellow at the Auburn University McCrary Institute for Cyber and Critical Infrastructure Security. In 2020, Coker was a member national security staff during the presidential transition of Joe Biden.

On July 17, 2023, it was reported that Coker was being considered as a potential nominee for National Cyber Director. He was formally nominated to the position on July 25, 2023. If confirmed, he would succeed Kemba Walden, the acting National Cyber Director. The Senate Homeland Security Committee held a nomination hearing for Coker on November 2, 2023. On November 15, 2023, the committee advanced his nomination by a 9–6 vote. On December 12, 2023, the United States Senate invoked cloture on his nomination by a 59–40 vote. Later that day, his nomination was confirmed by a 59–40 vote.

Coker left the Biden administration on January 20, 2025. A few days later, Maryland Governor Wes Moore nominated him as the secretary of the Maryland Department of Commerce, replacing Kevin Anderson. He was confirmed by the Maryland Senate and sworn in on February 28, 2025. During his tenure, Coker has sought to attract private investments to Maryland, especially following federal mass layoffs by the second Trump administration, which caused the state to lose more than 25,000 federal jobs.
