= Minnie M. Kenny =

American cryptanalyst, educator and equal opportunity activist (1929–2005)

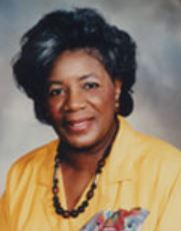
- Born: Minnie McNeal; 1929; Philadelphia, Pennsylvania
- Died: August 17, 2005 (aged 75–76); Columbia, Maryland

Minnie M. Kenny (1929–August 17, 2005) was a cryptanalyst, educator and equal opportunity activist who worked at the National Security Agency (NSA). She served as deputy commandant at the National Cryptologic School and was responsible for creating scholarships for NSA employees. The recipient of numerous awards, including the Meritorious and the Exceptional Civilian Service Awards, the presidential Meritorious Executive Award and Distinguished Service Award of the CIA, Kenny was inducted into the Cryptologic Hall of Honor in 2009.

== Biography ==
Minnie McNeal was born in 1929 in Philadelphia. After graduating from the Philadelphia High School for Girls, she worked for the Philadelphia Commerce Department and the United States Census Bureau in Washington, D. C., before being hired in 1951 to work at Arlington Hall for the Army Security Agency. She was part of the first group of African Americans who were allowed to work upstairs in the Operations Division, out of the basement, and was assigned to the 'U' Street School for training. After her training and the change of the organization from military footing to the National Security Agency in 1952, McNeal was assigned as a communications clerk to the ALLO (All Other (non-Soviet)) linguistics unit. She was particularly well known for her expertise in cryptanalysis, language and traffic analysis and worked with an elite "think tank" at NSA, to develop programs for cryptanalysis and language, serving as chair of the agency's Language Panel. In 1972, McNeal married Herbert Cornelius Kenny, one of the singers of The Ink Spots, with whom she had a daughter Daphne.

In 1973, Kenny became the founding editor of NSA's Group B journal Dragon Seeds and pressed for each cryptanalyst to have their own personal computer as a necessary tool. From 1975 to 1981, she served in the Office of Techniques and Standards of the NSA, as the chief of the language and linguistics. In 1980, she was the recipient of the Meritorious Civilian Service Award. Beginning in 1982, Kenny served as deputy commandant at the National Cryptologic School, and worked with traditional Black colleges and universities to increase diversity. She introduced computer-assisted teaching techniques and founded the Computer Assisted Learning and Instruction Consortium (CALICO) to bring professional language teachers and those who use language together in an international association. In 1984, Kenny was awarded a second civilian honor, the Exceptional Civilian Service Award by the NSA and both presidents Ronald Reagan and George H. W. Bush awarded her with the Meritorious Executive Award. After a decade working to improve the school, Kenny served on the Department of Defense Congressional Task Force on Women, Minorities, and the Handicapped in Science and Technology and as the NSA Director for Equal Employment Opportunity, before her 1993 retirement. She was a recipient of the Central Intelligence Agency's Distinguished Service Award.

Kenny then served as a Congressional Fellow on the staff of Congressman Louis Stokes and worked on the drafting of the Underground Railroad Act of 1997, which was designed to preserve and protect the history of significant buildings associated with the historic organization.

Kenny died August 17, 2005, in Columbia, Maryland, and was buried at St. John's Cemetery in Ellicott City, Maryland. Posthumously, in 2009, she was inducted into the Cryptologic Hall of Honor.
