= Robert L. Prestel =

American mathematician

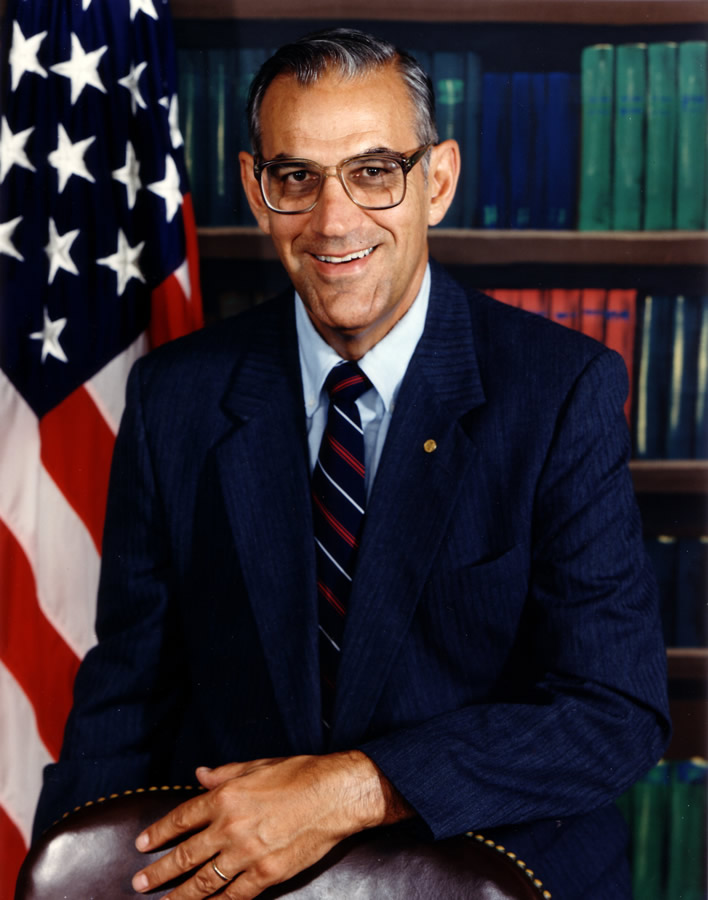

13th Deputy Director of the National Security Agency
- In office 29 July 1990 – 1 February 1994
- Preceded by: Gerald R. Young
- Succeeded by: William P. Crowell

Personal details
- Born: Robert Leo Prestel; February 11, 1936 (age 90) Indianapolis, Indiana, U.S.
- Profession: intelligence and security consultant, intelligence official, former mathematics professor

Robert Leo Prestel (born February 11, 1936) is an American intelligence official and mathematician who was Deputy Director of the National Security Agency from 1990 to 1994, during which time he was the highest ranking civilian in the agency. Prestel joined the NSA in 1962 and held many positions prior to being appointed as deputy director, including Director of Education and Training from deputy director for Research and Engineering. Among other positions Prestel has served in include trustee for the Institute for Defense Analyses and on the Board of Directors of WJ Communications. He currently serves as trustee emeritus of Institute for Defense Analyses.

Awards Prestel has received for his service to the intelligence community include the President's Distinguished Executive Award in 1988; the Department of Defense Distinguished Civilian Service Award in 1988; and the National Intelligence Distinguished Service Medal in 1991.

Government offices
Preceded by Gerald R. Young	Deputy Director of the National Security Agency; 1990–1994	Succeeded by William P. Crowell
