= Barbara McNamara =

American linguist (1942–2026)

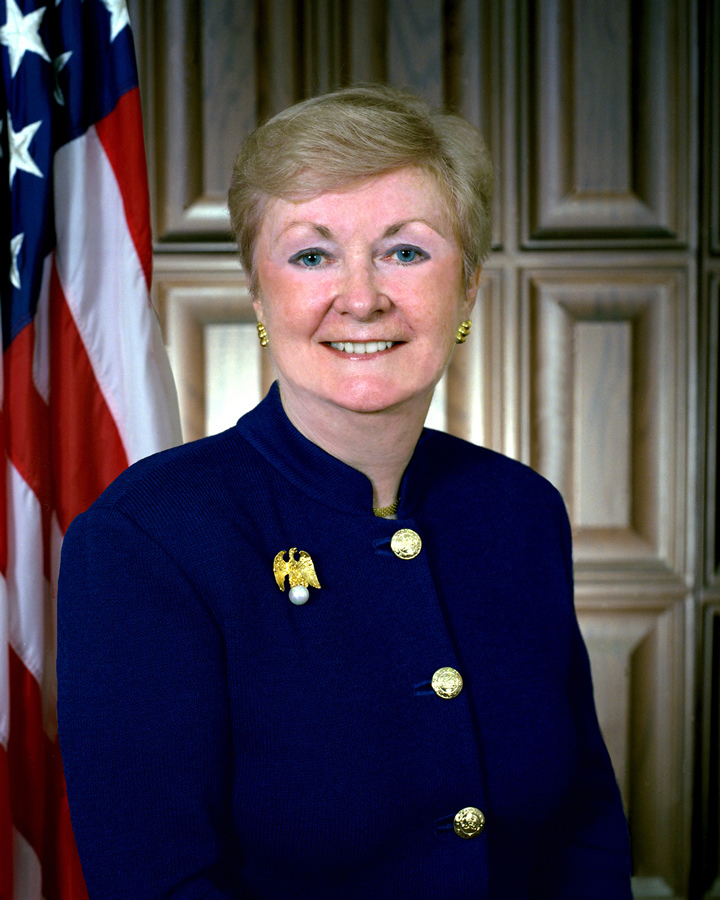

15th Deputy Director of the National Security Agency
- In office 1997–2000
- Preceded by: William P. Crowell
- Succeeded by: William B. Black, Jr.

Personal details
- Born: April 30, 1942 Clinton, Massachusetts, U.S.
- Died: January 17, 2026 (aged 83)
- Profession: Linguist, intelligence official
- Awards: National Intelligence Distinguished Service Medal
- Nickname: "BAM"

Barbara A. McNamara (April 30, 1942 – January 17, 2026) was an American linguist. She was the NSA's Deputy Director from October 1997 until June 2000. She was succeeded by William B. Black, Jr.

== Life and career ==
McNamara joined the NSA in 1963 as a linguist working with Chinese. She rose through a number of analytic, operational, and managerial positions before leaving the Operational Directorate in 1983. McNamara became the first woman to be named Deputy Director of Operations in 1994. In 1997 she became the second woman to be named the agency's deputy director. In June 2000, she received the US Intelligence Community's highest award, the National Intelligence Distinguished Service Medal. At the time she was one of the highest ranked women in the United States intelligence community. She served as the NSA's Senior U.S. Liaison Officer in London, England shortly before her retirement in 2003.

In 2020, she was inducted into the NSA Hall of Honor.

McNamara died at her home on January 17, 2026, at the age of 83.

Government offices
Preceded by William P. Crowell	Deputy Director of the National Security Agency; October 1997 – June 2000	Succeeded by William B. Black, Jr.
