= Kemba Walden =

American cybersecurity official

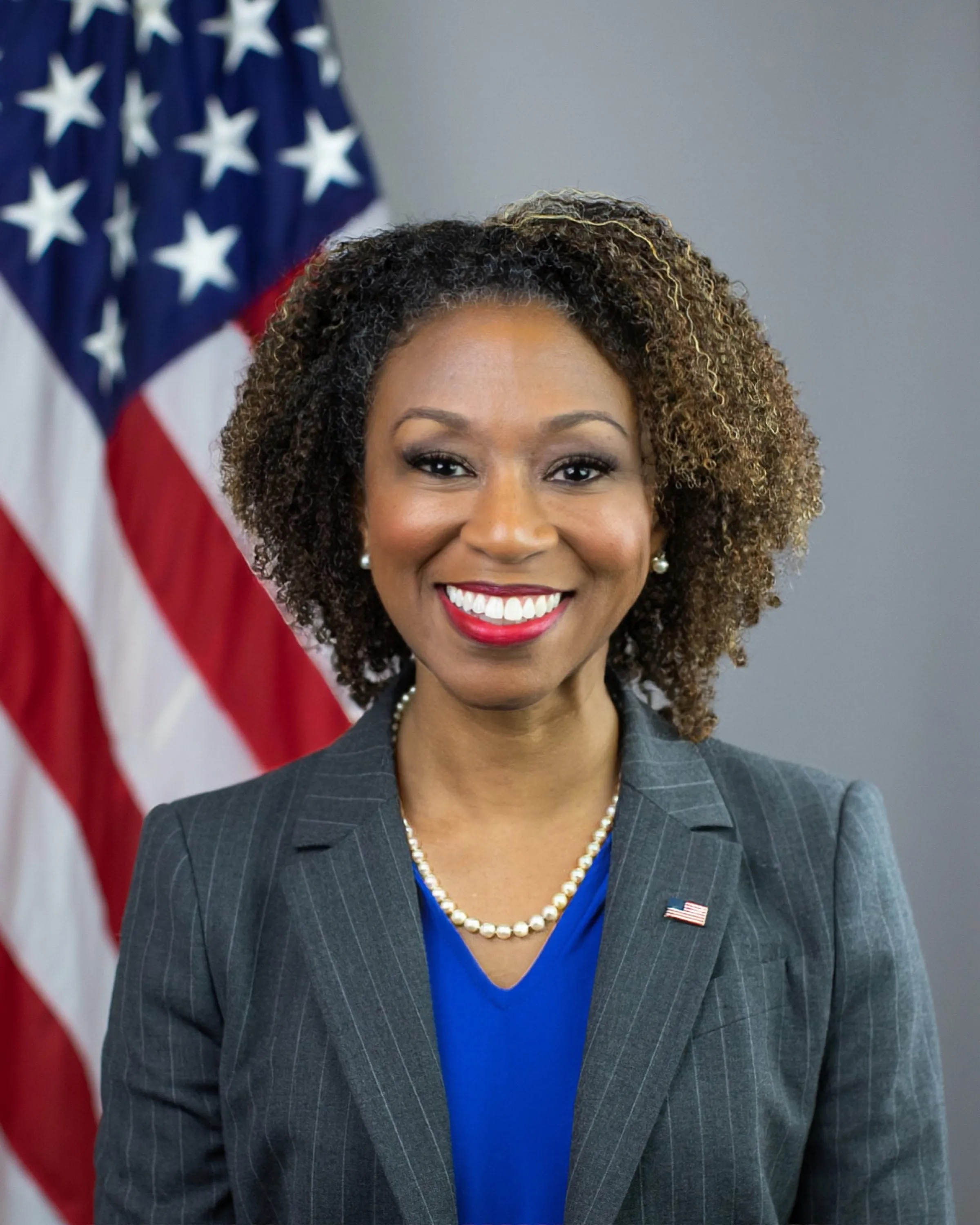

United States National Cyber Director
- Acting
- In office February 15, 2023 – November 17, 2023
- President: Joe Biden
- Preceded by: Chris Inglis
- Succeeded by: Drenan Dudley (acting)

Personal details
- Education: Hampton University (BA); Princeton University (MPA); Georgetown University (JD)

Kemba Eneas Walden is an American lawyer who served as the acting National Cyber Director in 2023. She joined the Office of the National Cyber Director as its principal deputy in May 2022. Walden was previously assistant general counsel of the Digital Crimes Unit at Microsoft.

== Life ==
Walden earned a B.A. from Hampton University. She earned a Master’s in Public Affairs from Princeton University and a J.D. from the Georgetown University Law Center.

== Career ==
Walden spent a decade in government service at the United States Department of Homeland Security, most recently at the Cybersecurity and Infrastructure Security Agency. In February 2022, Walden was appointed as an inaugural member of the Cyber Safety Review Board, and she contributed to its review of the December 2021 Log4j event. Walden later served as assistant general counsel of the Digital Crimes Unit (DCU) at Microsoft.

In May 2022, she joined the Office of the National Cyber Director, as its principal deputy. Upon the retirement of John C. Inglis on February 15, 2023, she became the acting director. She was involved in the development of the March 2023 National Cybersecurity Strategy.

On January 8, 2024, Walden was announced as president of the newly-launched Paladin Global Institute, a cybersecurity research and advocacy institute. She contributed to the Institute of Security and Technology's Ransomware Task Force and contributed to its April 2021 “Combating Ransomware” report and serves as co-chair. In April 2024, she advocated for a full ransomware payments ban.
