= William B. Black Jr. =

American intelligence analyst

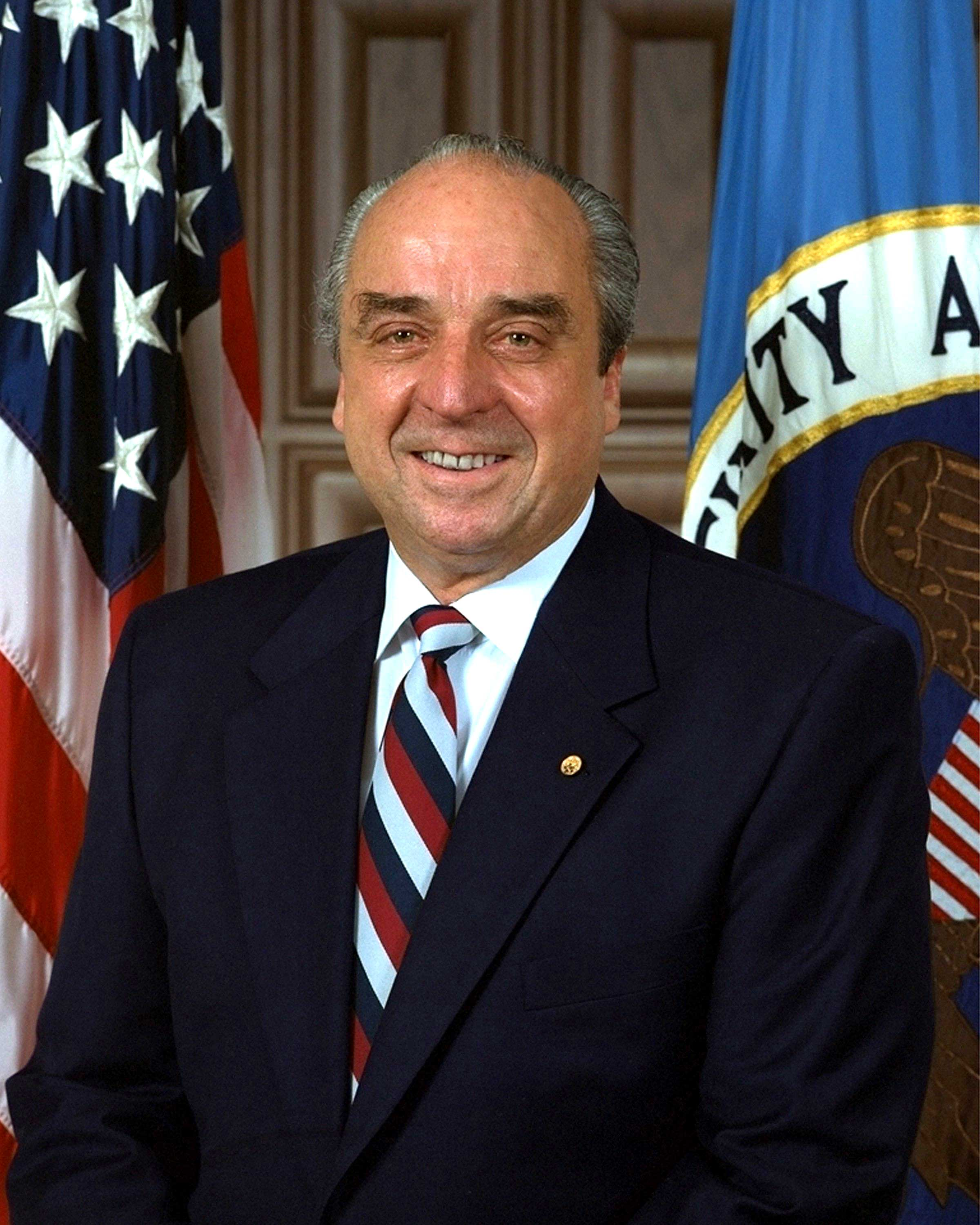

16th Deputy Director of the National Security Agency
- In office 2000–2006
- Preceded by: Barbara A. McNamara
- Succeeded by: John Chris Inglis

Personal details
- Born: William Bolding Black Jr. New Mexico, U.S.
- Spouse: Iris
- Children: three

Military service
- Branch/service: United States Army

William Bolding Black Jr. (born August 25, 1936) is a former Deputy Director of the National Security Agency.

== Professional career ==
=== Early NSA career (1959–1997) ===
Black joined the National Security Agency in 1959 as an operational linguist/analyst after three years in the Army. While employed at NSA, Black completed a wide variety of assignments including Special Assistant to the Director for Information warfare; Chief A Group (Operations Analysis); Chief, NSA/CSS Representative Europe office (NCEUR); Associate Deputy Director for Operations/ Military Support; and he served as both Chief and Deputy Chief of a major field installation. As he worked his way up to Senior Cryptologic Executive Service, his primary focus was on building new organizations and creating new ways of doing business. Black retired from the NSA in 1997.

=== Vice President at SAIC (1997–2000) ===
In 1997 Black became Assistant Vice President and Director of Information Operations in the Advanced Technologies and Solutions Group of the Science Applications International Corporation (SAIC). At SAIC, Black led Information Operations research and worked with the Information Operations Technology Center to establish an Institute for the Analysis of Complex Systems to develop advanced techniques for the analysis of networks and critical infrastructures.

=== Deputy Director at NSA (2000–2006) ===
Black returned to the NSA in 2000 to become deputy director. Since 2002 he was overseeing the Trailblazer Project, which was aimed at analyzing data on computer networks, and at tracking cell phone and email communications. In 2002, the main contract for Trailblazer, ultimately worth $1.2 billion, had been awarded to Black's former employer Science Applications International Corporation. In April 2005, the outgoing NSA director Michael Hayden told a Senate hearing that the Trailblazer program was several hundred million dollars over budget and years behind schedule. After Hayden's promotion to Deputy Director of National Intelligence, Black was acting Director of the NSA until the appointment of the new NSA director Lt. Gen. Keith B. Alexander. In August 2006, Black was replaced by John C. Inglis, and offered to take over the position as liaison officer to NSA's British intelligence counterpart.

A native of New Mexico, Black currently resides in Pasadena, Maryland with his wife Iris now deceased. They have three children.

== Education ==
- 1979 National War College, Fort McNair, Washington D.C.
- 1978–79 George Washington University Master's Program
- 1971 University of Maryland at College Park College Park, Maryland Bachelor of Arts/Political Science (Soviet Area Studies)
- 1957 U.S. Army Language School Monterey, California (Russian language)

== Assignments ==
- 2007 Retired
- 2006–2007 Special U.S. Liaison Officer, London
- 2000–2006 Deputy Director of the National Security Agency
- 1997–2000 SAIC/Information Operations Advanced Technologies and Solutions Group
- 1996–1997 Special Assistant to the Director for Information Warfare
- 1992–1996 Chief of Operations Analysis, Group A
- 1989–1992 Chief, NSA/CSS Representative Europe Office
- 1987–1989 Associate Deputy Director for Operations/Military Support
- 1986–1987 Chief of the Office of Collection Management
- 1984–1986 Chief of a major field installation
- 1982–1984 Deputy Chief of a major field installation
- 1979–1982 Chief of Operations of a major field installation
- 1975–1978 Chief of the Office of Customer Relations and Support to Military Operations

Before 1975, Black served in various positions at NSA Headquarters, NSA European Headquarters, and the Pentagon.

== Significant awards ==
- 2007 The NSA Bronze Medal
- 2006 National Security Medal
- 2006 3rd Exceptional Civilian Service Award
- 2005 Department of Defense Distinguished Civilian Service Award
- 2002 Distinguished Executive Presidential Rank Award
- 1998 Joint Intelligence Unit Citation for Information Warfare Staff
- 1997 2nd Exceptional Civilian Service Award
- 1996 National Intelligence Distinguished Service Medal
- 1992 Secretary of Defense Meritorious Civilian Service Award
- 1986 Exceptional Civilian Service Award
- 1984 Senior Executive Service Presidential Rank Award
- 1974 Meritorious Civilian Service Award
- 1959–80 Elevated through the ranks to the Senior Cryptologic Executive Service

== Sources ==
- Public domain biography from the NSA

Government offices
Preceded by Barbara A. McNamara	Deputy Director of the National Security Agency; June 2000 – August 2006	Succeeded by John C. Inglis
