= Dorothy Blum =

American computer scientist and cryptanalyst (1924–1980)

Dorothy Toplitzky Blum
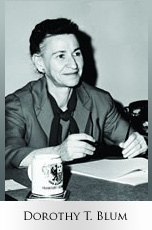
- Born: February 21, 1924; New York City, US
- Died: October 1, 1980 (aged 56)
- Education: Brooklyn College
- Occupations: Computer scientist, cryptanalyst
- Employer(s): National Security Agency, US Army

Dorothy Toplitzky Blum (February 21, 1924 – October 1, 1980) was an American computer scientist and cryptanalyst. She worked for the National Security Agency and its predecessors from 1944 until her death in 1980.

== Early life ==
Dorothy Toplitzky was born in 1924 in New York City to Austro-Hungarian immigrant parents.

== Career ==
After graduating from Brooklyn College in 1944, she joined the cryptologic unit of the U.S. Army. This unit focused on cryptanalysis, the study of analyzing information systems to gain access to hidden aspects of systems, in this case, the Axis powers' encrypted messages. After World War II, she worked for the United States Armed Forces Security Agency and later the National Security Agency (NSA).

During her time at the NSA in the 1950s, Blum was tasked with "keep[ing] abreast of the latest advances in the field of computing" and recommended computer technologies that could be adapted for cryptanalysis and communications intelligence. This included her use of the FORTRAN programing language beginning three years before its public release in 1957. She wrote computer software for the NSA and spearheaded the effort to teach NSA employees to write cryptanalytic programs.

Throughout the 1960s and 1970s, Blum continued to work in the field of computer science, helping to design the NSA's computer systems and automate processes. In 1972, she became the chief of the NSA Computer Operations Organization (C7), the only woman at the time in the organization's management hierarchy. She was appointed chief of Plans and Project Development Organization (T4) in the Telecommunications and Computer Services Organization in 1977. She was also involved in the Women in NSA (WIN) group.

== Legacy ==
Blum died from cancer on October 1, 1980, aged 56. An internal award at the NSA - the Dorothy T Blum Award for excellence in employee personal and professional development - was named after her. In 2004, she was inducted into the NSA Hall of Honor. An official NSA biography states that, in her 36-year career, Blum "significantly changed the way NSA did cryptanalysis." She was also elected one of the top 100 "most outstanding women in the federal government."

== Personal life ==
In 1950, she married NSA mathematician Joseph Blum, and they later had a son, David Blum.
