= William P. Crowell =

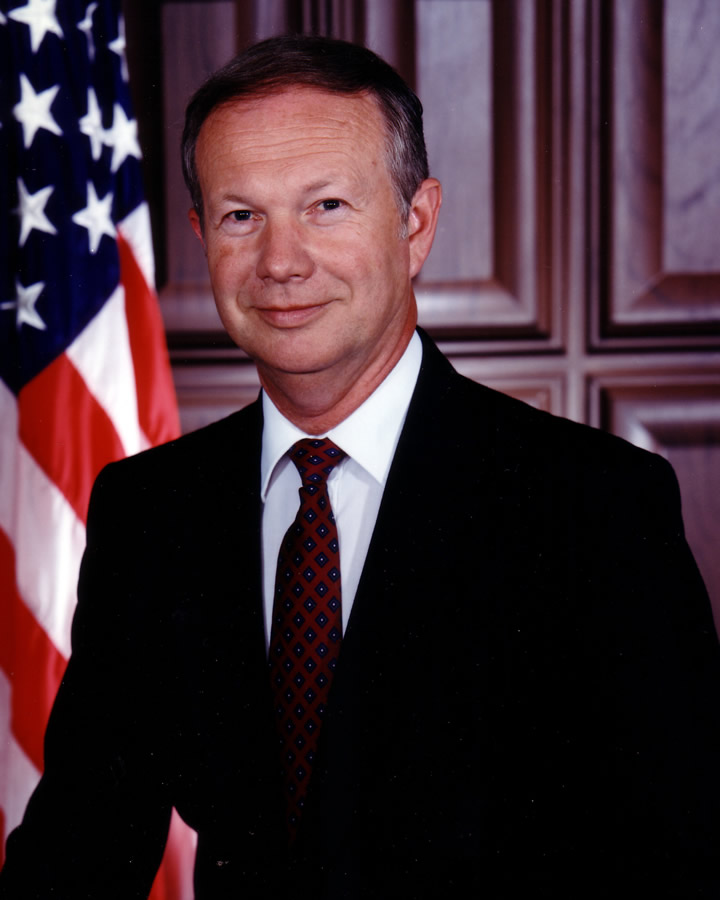

14th Deputy Director of the National Security Agency
- In office February 2, 1994 – September 12, 1997
- Preceded by: Robert L. Prestel
- Succeeded by: Barbara A. McNamara

Personal details
- Born: William Perry Crowell, Jr. November 26, 1940 (age 85) Louisiana, U.S.
- Spouse: Judy
- Children: 2
- Profession: independent consultant in information technology, security and intelligence systems, intelligence official

William Perry Crowell (born November 26, 1940) is the former Deputy Director of the National Security Agency. He served from February 1994 until September 1997.

== Early life ==
Crowell was born in Baton Rouge, Louisiana in 1940. His family moved to Dallas, TX in 1952 where he attended Woodrow Wilson High School. He was a member of the ROTC reaching the rank of Lt. Colonel, was a member of the rifle team and led the Pershing Rifles performance group. In 1956 he was elected President of Key Club International, a high school community service organization of 65,000 members and in that capacity traveled extensively, including a trip with Radio Free Europe to European capitals for meetings with senior officials of West Germany, Berlin, Paris and London.

== Professional career ==
=== Early NSA career 1962 –1989 ===
Crowell entered on duty with the National Security Agency in July 1962. His first assignment was as a recruiter for Masters and PhD graduates in Engineering, Mathematics, Physics and Computer Science at leading universities. After serving in several capacities in HR, he accepted a division chief assignment overseas. Upon completing that assignment, he returned to headquarters as a special assistant to the Director NSA in the Office of the executive director and served under two directors of the Agency in that capacity. During the remainder of his early career at NSA he served in a wide variety of assignments including Head of special projects for A Group (Operations Analysis); Deputy Chief of Counterintelligence (and acting Chief) for A Group; Chief of Staff for A2, Deputy Chief R&D for military systems; Assistant Deputy Director for Administration, Chief of the Science and Technology Organization; Chief of the Analysis Organization for the Soviet Union; and deputy director for Plans and Programs. In July 1989 he resigned from the National Security Agency.

=== Aerospace Industry: 1989-1990 ===
Vice President at Atlantic Aerospace Electronics Corporation (1989–1990) In 1989 Crowell became vice president and Director of Space Systems of Atlantic Aerospace Electronics Corporation. Atlantic Aerospace worked in many areas of research and development, including imagery processing techniques, signals processing, mathematics research, high-precision radar, and low-observable technology. Mr. Crowell established a new business that drew upon the technology strengths of the company to produce products for the Intelligence Community and successfully positioned the company to perform satellite systems work for the Aerospace Corporation and the NRO.

=== Chief of Staff, NSA: 1990–1991 ===
Crowell returned to the NSA in 1990 just days before the Iraqi invasion of Kuwait to become Chief of Staff of the Agency. As Chief of Staff, Mr. Crowell directed the daily activities of the office of the Director and deputy director of NSA, including the oversight of congressional relations and external customer relations. He represented the Director and deputy director in external activities, including public speeches, intelligence community boards, congressional testimony and oversight boards. In response to the challenges of Desert Shield and Desert Storm, Mr. Crowell developed a number of information systems, including networks, information displays, analyst support systems, and video-conferencing systems that provided the Directorate with access to real time information and also were used to improve analyst interaction and production.

=== Deputy Director for Operations, National Security Agency: 1991-1994 ===
The National Security Operations Center is responsible for carrying out the Signals Intelligence mission of the National Security Agency (NSA). This involves operating collection facilities across the globe, processing the signals that are collected, and producing intelligence reports for high-level policy makers and military leaders.

During his tenure, Mr. Crowell implemented significant changes to the scope, cost, and efficiency of these operations. He closed down the majority of conventional collection sites, which had employed thousands of people, and replaced them with a new structure of remote collection systems located in three regional collection facilities. He also initiated the development of new collection systems that focused on modern telecommunications and information technologies, as well as the emerging global Internet.

Additionally, he encouraged the development of tools to enhance analytic efficiency and effectiveness, such as high-performance networks, automated textual analysis and language support systems, and artificial intelligence techniques. Mr. Crowell played a key role in establishing the Regional Centers, which were instrumental in enabling the NSA to expand and develop its military workforce with expertise in all areas of cryptology.

=== Deputy Director, National Security Agency: February 1994 – September 1997 ===
President Clinton appointed Mr. Crowell as deputy director in February 1994, the senior civilian position in the National Security Agency. In this position, he served as chief operating officer of the Agency, guiding and directing the development of strategies and policy and serving as the principal advisor to the Director. He represented the Agency before congressional committees, presidential boards, and the public media. He fostered broad reexamination of core business processes, resulting in dramatic changes in strategic direction designed to cope with the continuing and rapid changes in cryptography, communications and information technology.

Crowell retired from the NSA in September 1997.

=== Commercial Industry Experience January 1998 – Present ===
Company	Position	Dates
Cylink Corp. (CYLK)	Vice President for Product Management	January 1998 – November 1998
Cylink Corp. (CYLK)	President and CEO	November 1998 – February 2003

=== Board Seats March 2003 – Present ===
Director	Company	Tenure	Acquisition
Chairman	Broadware Technologies	2002 – 2007	Acquired by Cisco in 2007
Chairman	Activcard (aka ActivIdenity)	2003 – 2006	
Director	Narus Corp.	2003 – 2010	Acquired by Boeing in 2010
Director	Proximex Corp	2007 – 2011	Acquired by ADT
Director	Ounce Labs	2006 – 2009	Acquired by IBM
Director	Air Patrol	2006 – 2014	Acquired by Inpixon
Director	SUNFED (Sun Microsystems subsidiary)	2008 – 2010	Acquired by Oracle
Director	Fixmo, Ottawa, Canada and Delaware Corp.	2009 – 2014	Acquired by Good Technologies
Director	SAP GSS subsidiary of SAP	2011 – 2013	
Director	DRS Finmeccanica Proxy Board	2008 – 2011	
Director	Six3 Systems	2009 – 2013	Acquired by CACI
Chairman	Centripetal Cybersecurity	2010 – 2017	
Director	Seaport Technologies	2019 – present	
Director	Redacted, Inc.	2022 – present	

=== Advisory Boards (selected 2003 – present) ===
- Unisys Corp
- Boeing Corp
- Hidden Level Technology
- ManTech International
- HRL Laboratory
- Kuprion, Inc.
- RunSafe Corp.
- Anametric, Inc.
- Lookingglass Cyber
- EdgeTheory, LLC

=== Education ===
Year	Institution	Program
1988	Harvard University	Program's Defense Policy Seminar
1985	Harvard University	Program for Senior Executives in National and International Security Affairs
1962-1966	George Washington University	Master's Program in Computer Science
1962	Louisiana State University	Bachelor of Arts/Political Science

=== Assignments ===
Year	Position
1997-Retired	
1994-1997	Deputy Director of the National Security Agency
1991—1994	Deputy Director of Operations, NSA
1990-1991	Chief of Staff, NSA
1989-1990	Vice President, Intelligence and Space Systems, Atlantic Aerospace Electronics Corporation
1988-1989	Deputy Director for Plans and Resources, NSA
1985-1988	Chief of A Group
1983-1985	Chief of W Group
1981–1983	Assistant Deputy Director of Administration, NSA
1979–1981	Deputy Chief of R2
1975–1979	Chief of Staff, A2
Before 1975	Various positions at NSA Headquarters, CIA, and overseas.

== Significant awards ==
Year	Award
2002	Secretary of Defense Medal for Outstanding Public Service
1997	National Security Medal
1997	National Intelligence Distinguished Service Medal
1997	DIA Director's Award
1997	FBI Distinguished Service Award
1996	Department of Defense Distinguished Civilian Service Award
1987	Distinguished Executive Presidential Rank Award
1985	2nd Exceptional Civilian Service Award
1983	Exceptional Civilian Service Award
1973	Meritorious Civilian Service Award
1979-1988	Elevated through the ranks to the Senior Cryptologic Executive Service

== Personal life ==
A native of Louisiana, Crowell currently resides in Leesburg, Virginia with his wife Judy.
