= Samuel Simon Snyder =

American cryptographer (1911–2007)

- Born: 18 August 1911
- Died: 28 December 2007 (aged 96)
- Education: B.S. in chemistry in 1939 from George Washington University
- Occupation: Cryptographer
- Known for: Cryptanalysis of Japanese military encryption Development of MARC standards
- Spouse: Patricia Yakerson Snyder (1935-1996)
- Children: 5

Samuel Simon Snyder (August 18, 1911 – December 28, 2007) was a cryptographer for the United States Government. His pioneering work in early computers led directly to the development of the computer as we know it, and laid the foundation for many aspects of the modern computing industry. He is known for having broken every Japanese encrypted message with his partners in the Signal Intelligence Service during World War II and for having developed the MARC standards.

== Career ==
Snyder was an alumnus of George Washington University, where, at the height of the Great Depression, he attended night school, working on various government jobs during the day. While still at the university, Snyder started his career in 1934 with the Signal Intelligence Service as one of the first 10 employees,. He worked at the National Security Agency until 1964. He graduated from George Washington University in 1939 with a B.S. in chemistry.

During World War II, Snyder coordinated teams and worked with William F. Friedman to break Japanese army cryptosystems. He also developed a more systematic approach to using sorting machines for cryptanalysis. Near the end of the war, he and his partners were able to break every Japanese encrypted message, which, according to the National Security Agency, "is believed to have directly contributed to shortening the war by at least one year". Snyder also determined whether computers that decoded Axis information at the Signal Intelligence Service were useful for other purposes, and concluded that they were integral to the agency; as a result, the NSA became the "leading computing industry on earth", according to his eldest son.

Later at NSA he worked on one of the early code breaking computers called ABNER and other computing systems such as Harvest, one of the earliest general-purpose computers made with IBM. After spending 30 years at the National Security Agency, he worked at the Library of Congress, where in 1964 he became an information systems specialist. He was the coordinator of the Library of Congress's information systems from 1964 to 1966. There, he helped to create the MARC standards, a machine readable cataloging system that became an international standard electronic database system for libraries and for data sharing in research.

From 1967 to 1970, he worked at the Research Analysis Corporation.

Snyder coauthored the book "Man and the Computer", which was published in 1972 with Ashley Montagu, as well as a classified history of the NSA.

Mr. Snyder was inducted into the NSA Hall of Honor in 2007, and he held a Defense Department Meritorious Civilian Service Award and The Washington Post's "Ideal Father of the Year" award for 1949.

== Personal life ==
Samuel Snyder married Patricia Yakerson Snyder in 1935; Patricia died in 1996.

He left behind 4 children, 9 grandchildren, and 5 great-grandchildren. Snyder's eldest son, named Sol and a professor at Johns Hopkins School of Medicine as of 2008, remembered Samuel Snyder's "knack for math and science" and that he spent his last years "basking in his passion for music". Sol's elder sister Elaine Hodges (d. 2006), then 12 years old, described Samuel Snyder as a "mathematician, artist, scientist, house cleaner, sewer, dog harness maker, dog bather, can play the clarinet, saxophone, piccolo, story writer, [and the] best father in the world" in a letter to the Washington Post asking that Snyder be named the Post’s “Ideal Father”; he was awarded that designation in 1949.

== Books ==
Ashley Montagu; Samuel Snyder (1972). Man and the Computer. Auerbach Publishers. ISBN 0877691460.

History of NSA General-Purpose Electronic Digital Computers, Samuel S. Snyder, National Security Agency, 1964.
