= Robert E. Drake =

American intelligence official (1923–2006)

Robert Drake
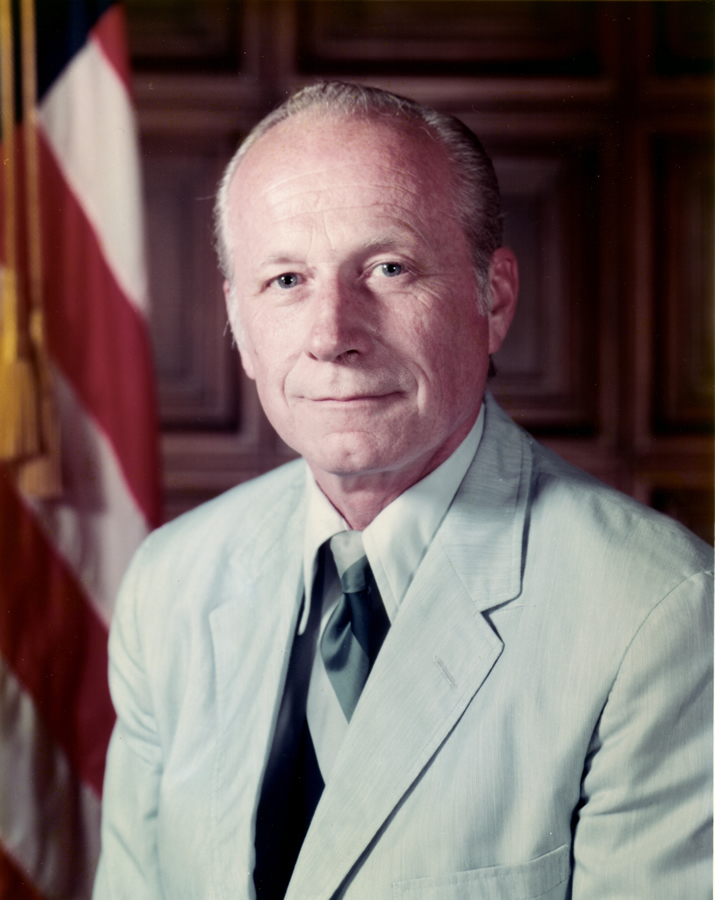

8th Deputy Director of the National Security Agency
- In office 1 May 1978 – 30 March 1980
- Preceded by: Benson K. Buffham
- Succeeded by: Ann Z. Caracristi

Personal details
- Born: Auberg Drake; October 11, 1923 Northfield, Minnesota, U.S.
- Died: January 12, 2006 (aged 82) Annapolis, Maryland, U.S.
- Spouse(s): Helen Suzanne Barstow "Sue" Drake, Marypage Mason Drake
- Profession: Intelligence analyst, consultant and official

Military service
- Allegiance: United States
- Branch/service: Army Air Forces
- Battles/wars: World War II

Robert Edwin Drake (October 11, 1923 – January 12, 2006) was an American intelligence official who was Deputy Director of the National Security Agency from 1978 to 1980 during which time he was the highest ranking civilian in the agency.

== Biography ==
He joined the Armed Services Security Agency in 1949 and eventually the newly created National Security Agency in 1952. With the NSA he served in overseas offices in Europe, Southeast Asia, and Hawaii. He also served in the position of Chief of the Soviet and East European Analytic Group and Deputy Director for Operations. Retiring from the NSA in 1978, he returned to independent consulting work. For his intelligence work he received the National Intelligence Distinguished Service Medal, National Security Agency Meritorious and Exceptional Civilian Service awards, the Defense Department Distinguished Civilian Service Award and the Central Intelligence Agency Distinguished Service Medal.

He was an alumnus of Carleton College, Minnesota, George Washington University and the National War College.

He died of heart failure in 2006, aged 82.

Government offices
Preceded by Ann Z. Caracristi	Deputy Director of the National Security Agency; 1978–1980	Succeeded by Charles R. Lord
