= Doyle E. Larson =

United States Air Force general

Doyle Eugene Larson
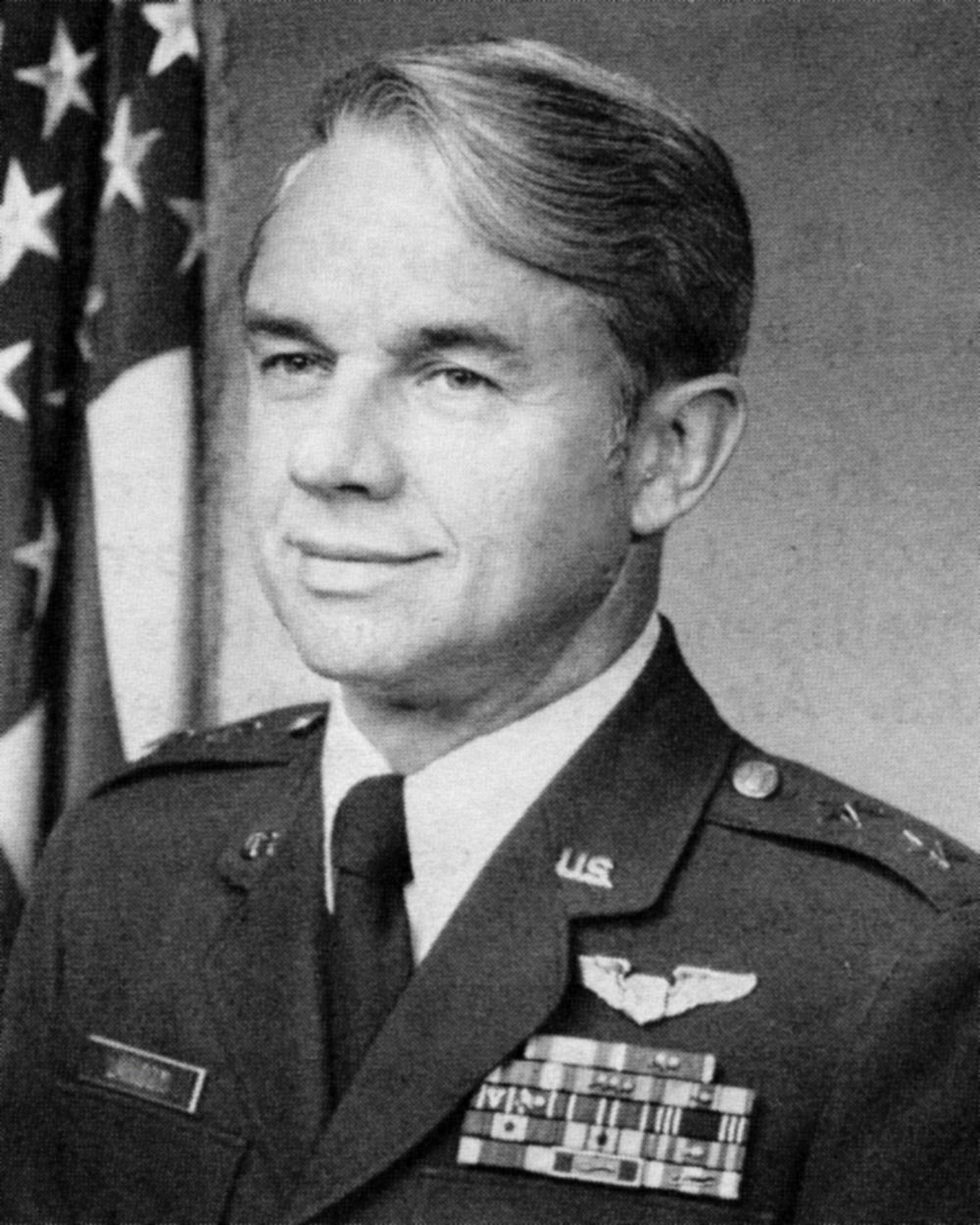
- Major General Doyle E. Larson
- Born: October 2, 1930; Madelia, Minnesota
- Died: August 13, 2007 (aged 76); Burnsville, Minnesota
- Military career
- Allegiance: United States of America
- Branch: United States Air Force
- Service years: 1951-1983
- Rank: Major General
- Commands: US Air Force Security Service; Electronic Security Command
- Conflicts: Korean War; Vietnam War
- Awards: Air Force Distinguished Service Medal; Legion of Merit (3); Meritorious Service Medal; Air Medal (4)

Doyle Eugene Larson (October 2, 1930 – August 13, 2007) was a United States Air Force major general. He was the first commander of the Electronic Security Command, a major command with headquarters at Kelly Air Force Base, Texas. The command was formed in August 1979 from the United States Air Force Security Service and other Air Force assets.

== Biography ==
Doyle E. Larson was born on October 2, 1930, in Madelia, Minnesota. He graduated from Madelia High School in 1948 and then attended Macalester College, St. Paul, Minnesota.

Larson entered the Air Force in March 1951 at Lackland Air Force Base, Texas. Upon completion of basic training he was assigned to the Army Language School, in Monterey, California, to study the Russian language. After graduation he was assigned to the U.S. Air Force Security Service at Brooks Air Force Base, Texas. In October 1952 he entered training as an aviation cadet at James Connally Air Force Base, Texas, and graduated with distinction in May 1953, earning his wings and a commission as a second lieutenant.

In June 1953 Larson transferred to Moody Air Force Base, Georgia, as a student for radar interceptor and air warfare training. In November 1953 he was assigned as a radar observer with the 84th Fighter-Interceptor Squadron, Hamilton Air Force Base, California. Beginning in May 1954 he was an aircraft observer at Wold Chamberlain Field, Minnesota, and in August 1954 at Fairbanks, Alaska, with the 18th Fighter-Interceptor Squadron.

Larson applied for duty with the U.S. Air Force Security Service and in October 1956 was assigned to March Air Force Base, California, to attend the Communications Intelligence course. He graduated first in his class in May 1957, and then served as the chief of the Analytical Training Branch of the school. In August 1958 he was placed in charge of an advance party in the movement of the intelligence school to Goodfellow Air Force Base, Texas. Larson's assignments at the school progressed into positions of increasing responsibility. In April 1959, after completing Squadron Officer School, he became chief of the Language Training Division.

In September 1961, Larson attended Hardin-Simmons University, Abilene, Texas, under the "Operation Bootstrap" program, receiving a bachelor of arts degree in English in 1962. In May 1962, he was assigned as commander of the newly designated 6985th Security Squadron at Eielson Air Force Base, Alaska. In 1965, he graduated from the Armed Forces Staff College at Norfolk, Virginia. In July 1965, as commander, he activated the 6949th Security Squadron at Offutt Air Force Base, Nebraska, and in July 1967, the 6990th Security Squadron at Kadena Air Base, Okinawa. During the war in Vietnam, the 6990th provided direct support to Air Force combat elements and received the Travis Trophy as the most outstanding cryptologic activity in the Department of Defense. Larson was credited with 71 combat missions during this period. In August 1970 he entered the Air War College, at Maxwell Air Force Base, and obtained a master's degree in political science from Auburn University in 1971.

In July 1971, Larson became the senior military representative of the National Security Agency at the Pentagon where, as the principal military spokesman for the director of the agency, he provided support to the Office of the Secretary of Defense, the Joint Chiefs of Staff and the military departments. He transferred to the Air Staff in July 1972 as assistant for joint matters, assistant chief of staff, intelligence, and in May 1973 became the director, policy and resource management.

In September 1974, Larson was appointed director for intelligence, Headquarters United States Pacific Command at Camp H.M. Smith, Hawaii. He became deputy chief of staff for intelligence, Headquarters Strategic Air Command in January 1977. He assumed command of U.S. Air Force Security Service in January 1979.

He was promoted to major general July 1, 1977, with date of rank May 1, 1974. He retired from the Air Force on August 1, 1983, and died on August 13, 2007. He was buried in Riverside Cemetery, in his hometown of Madelia, Minnesota.

== Awards and decorations ==
His military decorations and awards include the Distinguished Service Medal, Legion of Merit with two oak leaf clusters, Meritorious Service Medal, Air Medal with three oak leaf clusters, Air Force Commendation Medal with oak leaf cluster and the Air Force Outstanding Unit Award with two oak leaf clusters and "V" device. He wears the Aircraft Observer and Missile badges.

- Air Force Distinguished Service Medal
- Legion of Merit with two oak leaf clusters
- Meritorious Service Medal
- Air Medal with three oak leaf clusters
- Air Force Commendation Medal with oak leaf cluster
- Air Force Outstanding Unit Award with "V" device and two oak leaf clusters.

== Honors ==
Since 1979, the Maj. Gen. Doyle E. Larson Award has recognized the top technicians vital to the accomplishment of the Air Force's intelligence, surveillance and reconnaissance mission.

- In 1982, Larson was presented the Order of the Sword, an award for which Air Force non-commissioned officers honor leaders who have made significant contributions to the enlisted corps.
- In 2004, the Air Force Association named Larson its National Member of the Year.
- In 2005, he was inducted into the Minnesota Aviation Hall of Fame.
- In 2006, he was part of the first group to be inducted into the Defense Language Institute's Hall of Fame.
- In 2007, shortly before his death, the Air Force Intelligence, Surveillance and Reconnaissance Agency building on Lackland Air Force Base was renamed Larson Hall. A bronze bust honoring Larson was unveiled during the ceremony.
- In 2009, he was inducted into the National Security Agency Hall of Fame.
