= Julia Ward =

American cryptographer (1900–1962)

Julia Ward (December 1900 – June 18, 1962) was the founder of the central reference division of the National Security Agency (NSA). She was inducted into the Cryptologic Hall of Honor in 2002.

== Education ==
Ward received her A.B. from Bryn Mawr College in 1923 and her Ph.D from Bryn Mawr College in 1940.

== World War II ==
Ward joined the cryptologic service during World War II and worked for the Signal Security Agency (the Army's cryptologic organization). She also worked as a librarian and eventually built a collection of classified and unclassified materials for use by analysts. In 1945, she became the deputy chief of the reference section. Within a few years, she turned the section from one that was known as poorly organized, into a section that was widely recognized and highly respected.

In 1949, Ward was named head of the Collateral Branch, thereby becoming the only female branch head in the Office of Operations. In 1955, Ward was promoted to deputy chief of NSA's Liaison and Foreign Operations Section.

== Cryptologic Hall of Honor ==
Ward was inducted into the NSA's Cryptologic Hall of Honor in June 2002 at the National Cryptologic Museum in Baltimore, MD. Bryn Mawr College has a plaque to commemorate her placement in the Hall of Honor.
