= Gerald R. Young =

American intelligence official (1929–2021)

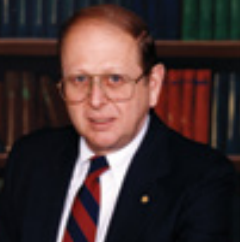

12th Deputy Director of the National Security Agency
- In office March 14, 1988 – July 28, 1990
- Preceded by: Charles R. Lord
- Succeeded by: Robert L. Prestel

Personal details
- Born: Gerald Robert Young; November 29, 1929 Winchendon, Massachusetts, US
- Died: October 27, 2021 (aged 91) Severna Park, Maryland, US
- Spouse: Lucille Kloman Young
- Children: 2
- Profession: intelligence consultant and official
- Awards: Presidential Rank Award of Distinguished Executive (1988), Presidential Rank Award of Meritorious Executive (1983), NSA Exceptional Civilian Service Award (1984), NSA Meritorious Civilian Service Award (1977), National Security Medal (1990)
- Nickname: Jerry

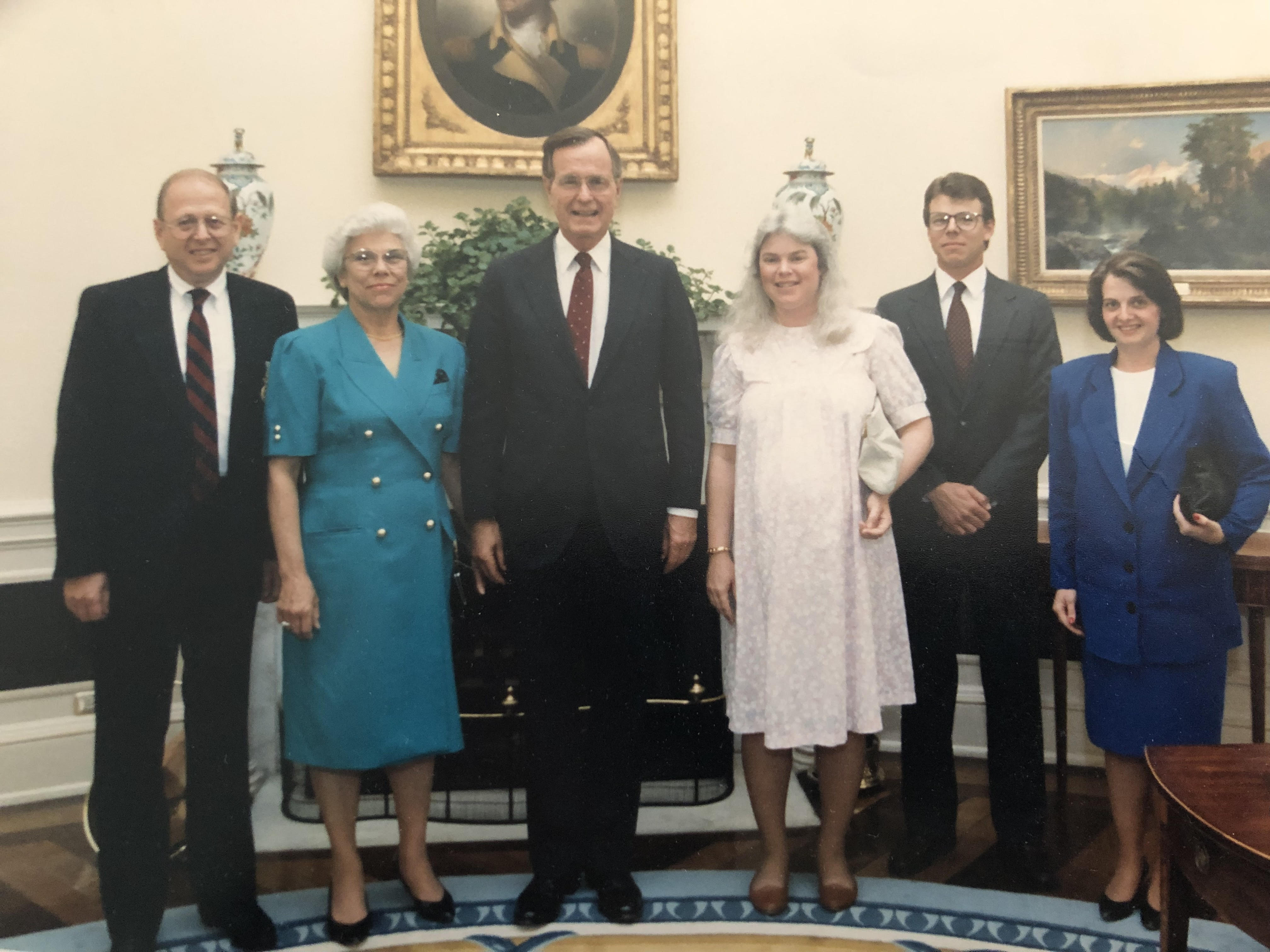
Taken at the White House in July 1990, while President Bush awarded Gerald Young with the National Security Medal. From left to right: Gerald Young, Lucille Young, President George H. W. Bush, Tracey Young, John Young, Cynthia Abadie.

Gerald Robert Young (November 22, 1929 – October 27, 2021) was an American intelligence official who was Deputy Director of the National Security Agency from 1988 to 1990, under director William O. Studeman during which time he was the highest ranking civilian in the agency. During his time at the NSA he also held the position of Deputy Director for Plans and Policy.

Prior to retirement Young was assigned in London as the Special US Liaison Officer to the intelligence agencies of the British Government. Prior to that time Young served as the Deputy Director of the National Security Agency. In this capacity he was the senior civilian executive responsible for the conduct of the Agency's national security mission. This mission includes the production of Signals Intelligence (SIGINT), development of computer security technologies, and development of US operations security doctrine, plans and programs. Young became Deputy Director of NSA in March 1988 and served in that capacity until going to London in August 1990.

Prior to becoming Deputy Director, Young served as Chief of Menwith Hill Station near Harrogate, England, from 1987 to 1988; served as the NSA Deputy Director for Plans and Policy from 1984 to 1987; served as the NSA Assistant Deputy Director for Programs and Resources from 1980 to 1984, and in that capacity also served as the NSA Comptroller. His experience at NSA included a variety of assignments as the Director of Communications Security Production and Control from 1978 to 1980, and a prior tour at Menwith Hill Station from 1966 to 1969.

After retiring in 1994, Young engaged in private consulting and also served as a guest lecturer in Management at the Johns Hopkins College of continuing education. Young served on the Board of Directors of DPC Technologies of Gaithersburg, Maryland.

Young graduated from Merrimack College in 1951 with a BS in Business Administration. He completed the Harvard Graduate School of Business Administration Program for Management Development in 1963 and is also a 1973 graduate of the National War College and a 1978 graduate of the Federal Executive Institute. He received the Presidential Rank Award of Distinguished Executive in 1988 from President Reagan, the Presidential Rank Award of Meritorious Executive in 1983, the NSA Exceptional Civilian Service Award in 1984, and the NSA Meritorious Civilian Service Award in 1977. In addition to the above,Young received the National Security Medal from President George H.W. Bush at the White House in July 1990. This is the nation's highest award for service to US Intelligence.

Government offices
Preceded by Charles R. Lord	Deputy Director of the National Security Agency; 1988–1990	Succeeded by Robert L. Prestel
