= 1222 28th Street NW =

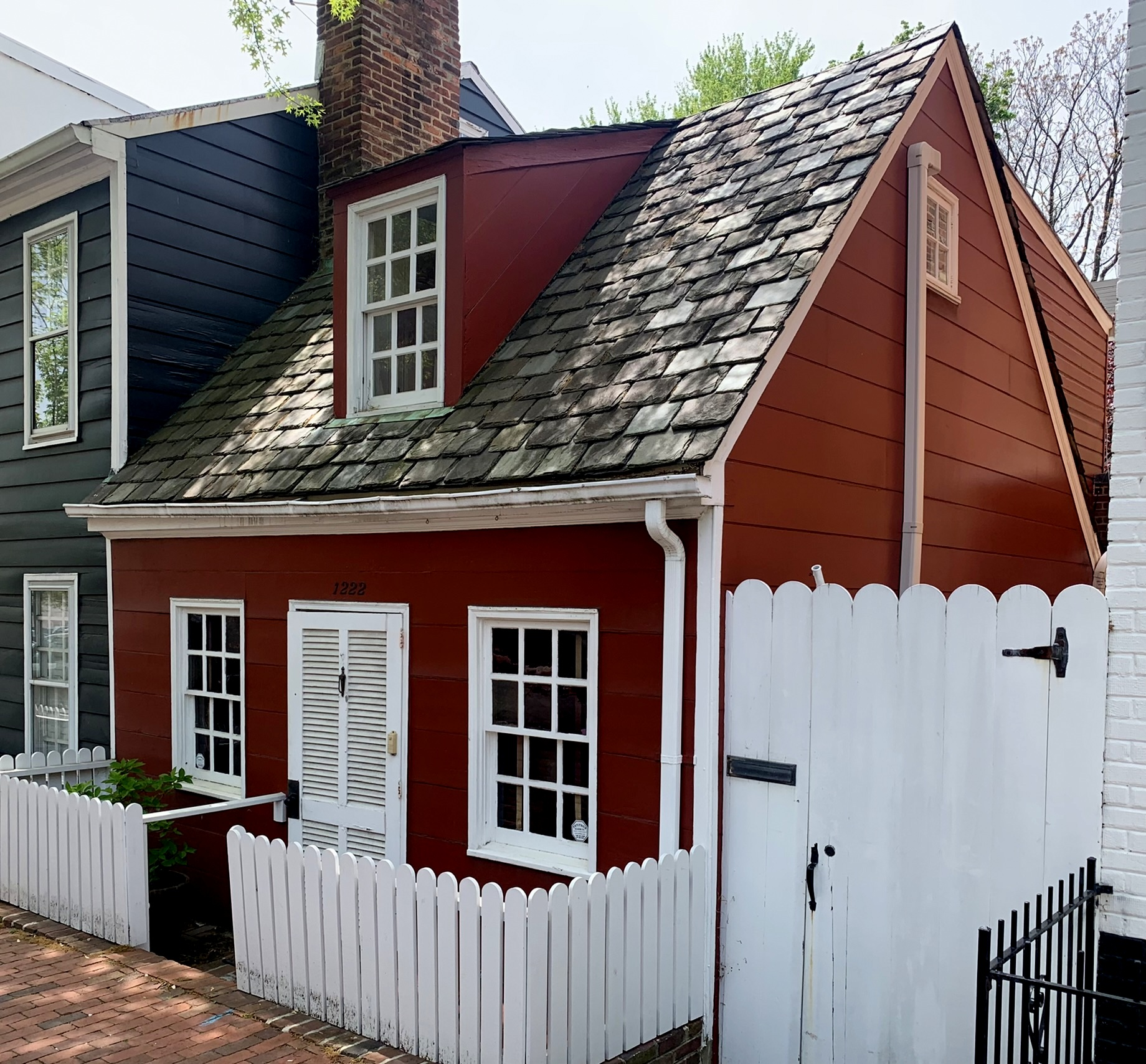
- The cottage in 2022
- Interactive map of the 1222 28th Street NW area

General information
- Location: Georgetown, Washington, D.C., U.S., 1222 28th Street NW
- Coordinates: 38.9059°N 77.0571°W

Technical details
- Floor count: 2
- Floor area: 1,015 sq ft

1222 28th Street NW is a building in the historic Georgetown neighborhood of Washington, D.C. It is believed to be one of the oldest homes in Georgetown, dating to the 18th century, although a Historic American Buildings Survey, published in the 1960s, claimed the cottage dates to the mid-19th century. A third source, published in 1970, says the property dates to the late 18th century. It has one bedroom in its floor area of 1,015 square feet.

== History ==
The house is believed to have been built in the 1700s by a British sea captain, with its hand-hewn ceiling beams possibly being from a ship that had run aground. The year 1721 is carved into one of the interior beams.

As of 2016, several of the building's original features were still intact, including the Belgian tiles in front of the hearth, wood paneling and flooring, and handmade glass in its windows.

The cottage was the home of Ann Caracristi, former deputy director of the National Security Agency, for 65 years, until her death in January 2016. Caracristi had built a kitchen at the rear of the house in 1985, at the same time turning the original kitchen into a laundry and powder room.

The relatives of Caracristi put the property (including many of its furnishings) on the market after her death. Its listing price was $865,000. It sold on March 25, 2016, for $825,000.

The Washington Post featured the property as its "House of the Week" on February 26, 2016.
