= M94 =

M94 or M-94 may refer to:

- Messier 94, a spiral galaxy in the constellation Canes Venatici
- M-94 (Michigan highway), a state highway in Michigan
- M-94 (cipher machine), a cryptographic device
- M94, FAA Location Identifier for Desert Aire Regional Airport, Mattawa, Washington
