= Louis W. Tordella =

National Security Agency official (1911–1996)

Louis William Tordella
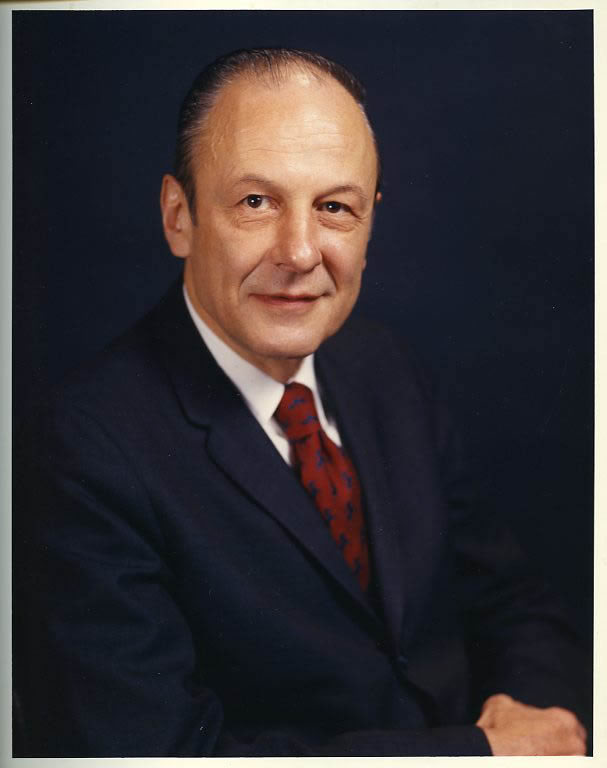

6th Deputy Director of the National Security Agency
- In office 1 August 1958 – 21 April 1974
- Preceded by: H. T. Engstrom
- Succeeded by: Benson K. Buffham

Personal details
- Born: May 1, 1911 Garrett, Indiana, U.S.
- Died: January 9, 1996 (aged 84) Bethesda, Maryland, U.S.
- Spouse: Barbra Tordella
- Children: three
- Education: Loyola University of Chicago; University of Illinois
- Profession: Cryptologist, intelligence analyst, consultant and official, mathematician

Military service
- Allegiance: United States
- Branch/service: United States Navy
- Battles/wars: World War II

Louis William Tordella (May 1, 1911 – January 9, 1996) was the longest serving deputy director of the National Security Agency.

== Biography ==
=== Early life and career ===
Tordella was born in Garrett, Indiana, on May 1, 1911 and grew up in the Chicago environs. He displayed an early affinity for mathematics, and obtained bachelors, masters, and doctoral degrees in the 1930s. The outbreak of World War II found him teaching mathematics at Chicago's Loyola University. He joined the US Navy, immediately made contacts in the service, and was brought aboard as a lieutenant junior grade in 1942. He went directly into cryptologic work for the Navy's codebreaking organization, OP-20-G. He finished the war at OP-20-G collection stations on the West Coast, at Bainbridge Island, Washington, and Skaggs Island Naval Communication Station.

=== Career in the NSA ===
After the war Tordella stayed on with the Navy, and in 1949 joined the newly created Armed Forces Security Agency (AFSA), an early attempt to achieve service unity in the business of cryptology. He was a key figure in devising policy for the new agency, and for its successor, the National Security Agency, which emerged in 1952 to replace AFSA.

His career at NSA brought him to the very front rank of cryptologists. He was an early advocate of the use of computers for cryptologic work, and helped to cement a close working relationship with American industry. His grasp of computer technology and the associated engineering concepts, coupled with his understanding of cryptanalysis, led Tordella to push forcefully for the development of supercomputers for cryptologic applications. Tordella was also a leader in securing American communications, pushing a series of leading-edge new encoding devices to secure U.S. Government communications.

As a senior official at NSA, Tordella played a central role in NSA's outside relationships. Close collaborators in Britain and the Commonwealth of Nations built up such a trust with Tordella that many foreign intelligence officials regarded him as the linchpin in their relationship with NSA.

Tordella became the deputy director of NSA in 1958, and remained in the post until his retirement in 1974. He thus became the longest serving deputy director in NSA's history.

He was reportedly reluctant to release NSA intelligence on the Cuban Missile Crisis compiled by Juanita Moody on the grounds that only the Central Intelligence Agency was chartered to distribute such reports.

While serving as Deputy Director of the NSA, he commented on the 1967 USS Liberty incident: “I believe it was a deliberate attack.” His thoughts were further reflected in a NSA report in which he referred to the cover-up as “A nice whitewash for a group of ignorant, stupid and inept XXX [expletive]. If the attackers had not been Hebrew there would have been quite a commotion. Such crass stupidity – 30 knots, warship, 2 guns, etc., does not even do credit to the Nigerian Navy.” After consideration was given to ordering a U.S. Navy submarine to sink the Liberty in order to avoid the political liability of her being photographed, Tordella vocally opposed the idea: “Consideration was being given by some unnamed Washington authorities to sink the Liberty in order that newspaper men would be unable to photograph her and thus inflame public opinion against the Israelis. I made an impolite comment about that idea.”

=== Later career ===
Tordella received unprecedented honors over the years. On his retirement in 1974 he received both the National Security Medal and the National Intelligence Distinguished Service Medal. His relationship with the British was recognized in 1976 when he became an Honorary Knight Commander of the Most Excellent Order of the British Empire. In 1992 the Security Affairs Support Association, composed mainly of retired intelligence officials, gave him the William O. Baker medal for distinguished service to American intelligence.

=== Death ===
He died at the Bethesda Naval Hospital in 1996. He had both Waldenström's macroglobulinemia and colon cancer but no autopsy was done to determine actual cause of death.

== Aftermath ==
Following his death, sixteen boxes were recovered from his NSA office safe. According to Stephen Budiansky, "...the documents turned out to be a compendium of every single one of NSA's most highly classified, compartmented programs of the post-World War II era." Lew Allen, the Director of the National Security Agency at the time, subsequently ensured "no NSA department director ever again wielded such untrammeled power."

== See also ==
- Project Shamrock

Government offices
Preceded by H. T. Engstrom	Deputy Director of the National Security Agency; August 1958–April 1974	Succeeded by Benson K. Buffham
