= United States National Cyber Director =

Senior US government agency for cybersecurity

Office of the National Cyber Director

Agency overview
- Formed: January 1, 2021; 5 years ago
- Headquarters: Presidential Townhouse
- Annual budget: $21 million
- Agency executive: Vacant, National Cyber Director
- Parent agency: Executive Office of the President
- Website: www.whitehouse.gov/oncd/

The Office of the National Cyber Director is an agency in the United States government statutorily responsible for advising the president of the United States on matters related to cybersecurity. It was established in 2021. The agency is headquartered at the Presidential Townhouse at 716 Jackson Place NW in Washington, D.C..

== History ==
The position of national cyber director was established under the National Defense Authorization Act for Fiscal Year 2021 on the recommendation of the Cyberspace Solarium Commission, a congressionally-authorized panel convened in 2019 and chaired by United States senator Angus King and representative Mike Gallagher. Situated within the Executive Office of the President of the United States, it is statutorily charged with "programs and policies intended to improve the cybersecurity posture of the United States, ... diplomatic and other efforts to develop norms and international consensus around responsible state behavior in cyberspace" and other matters related to cybersecurity.

Authorizing legislation for the office permitted the hiring of up to 75 staff, however, failed to appropriate any funds to do so. By August 2021, the White House was able to identify $250,000 in contingency funding to hire a few personnel to support inaugural director Chris Inglis. Later in 2021, the Infrastructure Investment and Jobs Act provided $21 million in funding for the ONCD. On March 2, 2023, the office published a national cybersecurity strategy and on July 31, 2023, the office published a national cyber workforce and education strategy.

Less than a month into President Donald Trump's second term in office, he nominated Sean Cairncross to serve as national cyber director. It was not until August 2, 2025, that the U.S. Senate confirmed Cairncross for the role.

== List of national cyber directors ==
| No. | Portrait | Officeholder | Term start | Term end | Days | President |
|---|---|---|---|---|---|---|
| 1 | | Chris Inglis | July 12, 2021 | February 15, 2023 | 583 | Joe Biden |
| – | | Kemba Walden (Acting) | February 15, 2023 | November 17, 2023 | 275 | Joe Biden |
| – | | Drenan Dudley (Acting) | November 17, 2023 | December 15, 2023 | 28 | Joe Biden |
| 2 | | Harry Coker | December 15, 2023 | January 20, 2025 | 402 | Joe Biden |
| 3 | | Sean Cairncross | August 4, 2025 | November 19, 2026 | 472 | Donald Trump |

== See also ==
- United States Cyber Command
- Cybersecurity and Infrastructure Security Agency
- National Initiative for Cybersecurity Education
- United States Ambassador-at-Large for Cyberspace and Digital Policy
- Bureau of Cyberspace and Digital Policy
