= Ann Z. Caracristi =

Cryptanalyst and National Security Agency official (1921–2016)

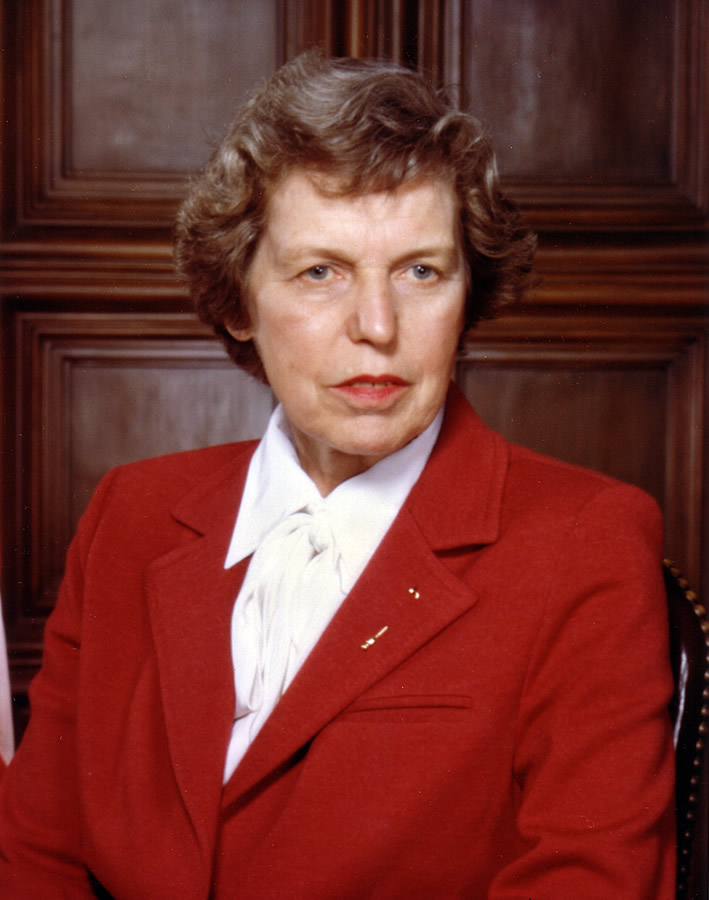

9th Deputy Director of the National Security Agency
- In office April 1, 1980 – July 30, 1982
- Preceded by: Robert E. Drake
- Succeeded by: Robert E. Rich

Personal details
- Born: Ann Zeilinger Caracristi; February 1, 1921 Bronxville, New York, U.S.
- Died: January 10, 2016 (aged 94) Washington, D.C., U.S.
- Education: Russell Sage College; Federal Executive Institute
- Profession: Cryptanalyst, intelligence consultant and official

Ann Zeilinger Caracristi (February 1, 1921 – January 10, 2016) was an American cryptanalyst and Deputy Director of the National Security Agency, where she served at various positions over a 40-year career. She served as a member of the Secretary of Defense Joint Security Commission and President's Foreign Intelligence Advisory Board. She became the first woman at NSA to be promoted to GS-18 rank, in 1975, when she became the Chief of Research and Operations.

== Biography ==
She was born in Bronxville, New York. She attended Russell Sage College, a women’s college in Troy, New York, and graduated in 1942, with degrees in English and History. After graduation, she was recruited by the Army Signal Intelligence Service to work as a code breaker, at the recommendation of the Dean of Russell Sage. She worked on IBM machines, starting with sorting paper, but quickly rose through the ranks. Caracristi was sent to Washington, D.C., she attended the cryptanalysis courses of William Friedman and Evelyn Niemann Akeley, where puzzles were used to train cryptographers in the art of pattern recognition.

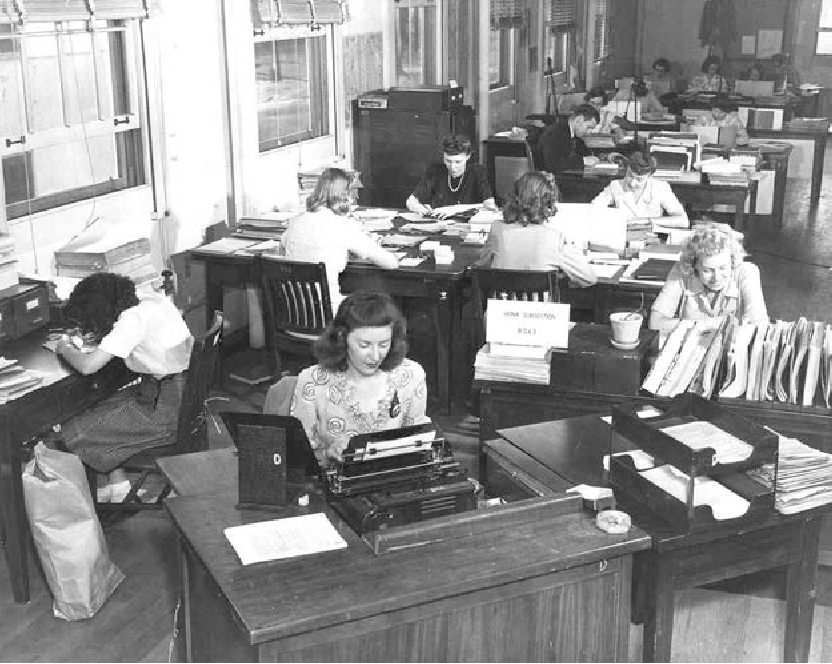
Ann Caracristi (right) at work at the Signals Intelligence Service

During World War II, Caracristi's cryptography work was focused on deciphering the additive systems used by Japanese military forces and merchant fleet. She was known for her exceptional talent at reconstructing enemy code books. She and her colleagues were among the first Americans to learn of Japan's planned surrender, having deciphered the code on August 14, 1945.

Following the war, Caracristi was hired at an agency that would later become part of the National Security Agency. She was promoted first to supergrade, a higher civil service paygrade, in 1959, and then to GS-18 (the highest supergrade) as the Chief of Research and Operations in 1975.

In 1980, Caracristi became the sixth NSA Deputy Director, the first woman to serve in this role. She received the Department of Defense Distinguished Civilian Service Award in 1980, the highest award given to civilians. As Deputy Director, she was credited with providing leadership for new generations of code breakers and integrating the use computers and technology.

Colleagues described her as an inspired leader. She preferred to be remembered for her operational accomplishments rather than her gender. She was one of the first women at the National Security Agency to be promoted to a "super-grade," the equivalent of the modern Senior Executive Service; the first woman to be chief of a major operations group; and she was the first Deputy Director of NSA.

She retired in 1982, but continued to serve on panels for the Intelligence Community, including President Clinton’s Foreign Intelligence Advisory Board (appointed 1993). In 2003, Caracristi was given an honorary degree by the National Intelligence University, where an academic award in her name is given to a high-performing graduate student each year.

She lived most of her adult life in an 18th-century one-bedroom cottage at 1222 28th Street NW in Georgetown, and her hobbies included birds and collecting pewter. Ann was predeceased by her longtime partner Gertrude Elizabeth Kirtland, a crypto analyst and author.

In 2002, her name was given to a Naval Intelligence Professionals' award. Caracristi died January 10, 2016, in Washington at the age of 94. She had dementia in her later years.

== Awards and other recognition ==
In 1980, she received the Department of Defense Distinguished Civilian Service Award.

She is one of the subjects of the 2017 non-fiction book Code Girls: The Untold Story of the American Women Code Breakers of World War II by Liza Mundy.

== See also ==
- Code Girls

Government offices
Preceded by Robert E. Drake	Deputy Director of the National Security Agency; April 1980 – July 1982	Succeeded by Robert E. Rich
