= Benson K. Buffham =

Director of the NSA

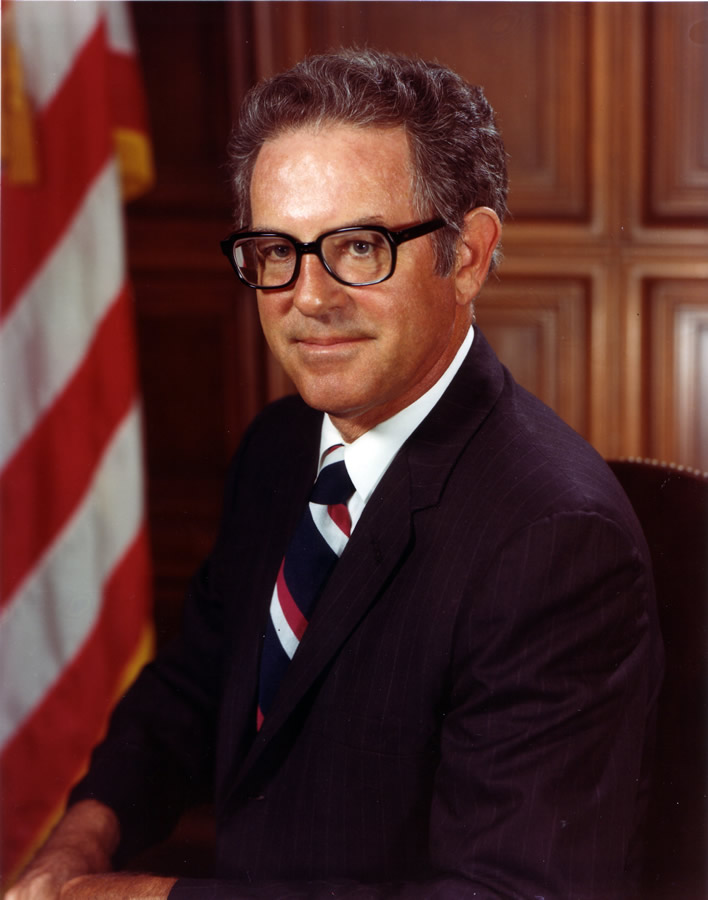

7th Deputy Director of the National Security Agency
- In office 22 April 1974 – 30 April 1978
- Preceded by: Louis W. Tordella
- Succeeded by: Robert E. Drake

Personal details
- Born: Benson Kirk Buffham; 26 November 1919 Oak Park, Illinois, U.S.
- Died: 24 April 2019 (aged 99) Pompano Beach, Florida, U.S.
- Education: Wesleyan University
- Profession: intelligence analyst, consultant and official

Military service
- Allegiance: United States
- Branch/service: Army Medical Corps, Army Security Agency
- Battles/wars: World War II

Benson Kirk Buffham (November 26, 1919 – April 24, 2019) was an American intelligence official who served as the Deputy Director of the National Security Agency from 1978 to 1980, during which time he was the highest- ranking civilian in the agency.

== Biography ==
He was born November 26, 1919, in Illinois. Buffham joined the Armed Forces Security Agency in 1949 and went on to the newly formed National Security Agency in 1952. In 1955, Buffham was one of the first NSA employees to attend the National War College. With the NSA he had served at the Europe office as Chief of Field Activities as well as various positions in the Production Organization including Deputy Assistant Director for Production. In 1950, he took part in organizing the Inspector General's office. After his deputy directorship, he served in London as the Senior Liaison Officer until he retired in 1980. Buffham died in April 2019 at the age of 99.

Government offices
Preceded by Louis W. Tordella	Deputy Director of the National Security Agency; 1974–1978	Succeeded by Robert E. Drake
