= Chris Inglis =

American government official (born 1954)

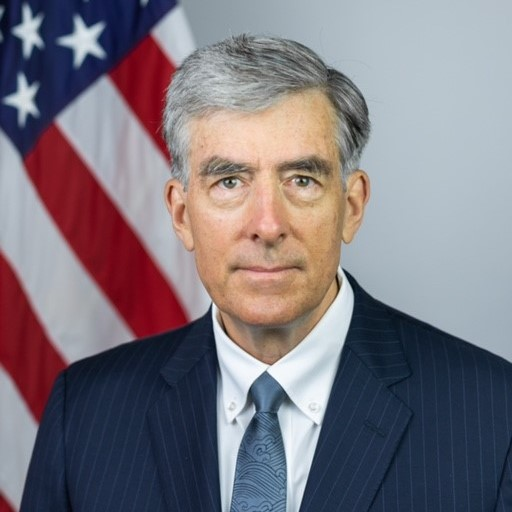

United States National Cyber Director
- In office July 11, 2021 – February 15, 2023
- President: Joe Biden
- Preceded by: Position established
- Succeeded by: Harry Coker

17th Deputy Director of the National Security Agency
- In office 2006–2014
- President: George W. Bush; Barack Obama
- Preceded by: William B. Black Jr.
- Succeeded by: Richard Ledgett

Personal details
- Born: October 29, 1954 (age 71) Baltimore, Maryland, U.S.
- Education: United States Air Force Academy (BS); Johns Hopkins University (MS); Columbia University (MS)

Military service
- Allegiance: United States
- Branch/service: United States Air Force
- Years of service: 1976–2006
- Rank: Brigadier General
- Unit: U.S. Air National Guard; National Security Agency
- Commands: Chief of Staff of the Maryland Air National Guard

John Chris Inglis (born October 29, 1954), generally known as Chris Inglis, is an American government official who served as the first National Cyber Director. Inglis is also a former Deputy Director of the National Security Agency. On April 12, 2021 President Joe Biden nominated Inglis to serve as the first National Cyber Director. His nomination was confirmed by the Senate by voice vote on June 17, 2021. He was sworn into office on July 11, 2021. He resigned from the position on February 15, 2023.

== Early life and education ==
Inglis was born in Baltimore, Maryland on 29 October 1954. He graduated from Andover High School, Linthicum in 1972. Inglis is a Distinguished Eagle Scout.

After high school, Inglis attended the United States Air Force Academy, graduating in 1976 as a Distinguished Graduate with a Bachelor of Science Degree in Engineering Mechanics.

- 1996 – Graduate of Air War College, USAF Squadron Officers School, Air Command and Staff College
- 1990 – Graduated George Washington University, Professional Degree Computer Science
- 1984 – Graduated Johns Hopkins University, M.S. in Computer Science
- 1977 – Graduated Columbia University, M.S. in Mechanical Engineering

Inglis' training includes undergraduate and Instructor Pilot Training, and he also attended the Air War College where he was designated Outstanding Graduate.

== Career ==
=== Assignments ===
- 2015– – Robert and Mary M. Looker Professor in Cyber Security Studies, United States Naval Academy
- 2006–2014 – Deputy Director of the National Security Agency
- 2003–2006 – Special United States Liaison Officer – London
- 2001–2003 – Signals Intelligence Deputy Director for Analysis and Production
- 1999–2001 – Chief, Office of China and Korea, Operations Directorate
- 1998–1999 – Deputy Chief, Office of China and Korea, Operations Directorate
- 1997 – Promoted to the Senior Executive Service
- 1996–1997 – Senior Operations Officer, National Security Operations Center
- 1995–1996 – Deputy Chief, NSA Office of Encryption Policy
- 1992–1995 – Participant in Senior Cryptologic Executive Development Program Management and staff tours in the Directorates of Operations, Information Systems Security and Plans and Programs.
- 1991–1992 – Visiting Professor, Department of Electrical Engineering and Computer Science, U.S. Military Academy, West Point, NY
- 1986–1991 – Information Security Analyst and Manager up through division level within NSA's Information Systems Security Directorate.
- 1983–1986 – Mechanical Engineering professor at US Naval Academy

=== Significant awards ===
- 2014 – President's National Security Medal
- 2014 – Director of National Intelligence Distinguished Service Medal
- 2009 – Presidential Rank Award for Distinguished Service
- 2006 – U.S. Air Force Distinguished Service Medal
- 2004 – Presidential Rank Award for Distinguished Service
- 2002 – Exceptional Civilian Service Award
- 2000 – Presidential Rank Award for Meritorious Service
- 1992 – Department of the Army – Outstanding Civilian Service Award

=== External assignments ===
- 1985–2006 – Brigadier General in the Air National Guard and qualified as a command pilot. Has commanded at Flight, Squadron, Group and Joint Force Headquarters.
- 1976–1985 – U.S. Air Force officer and pilot. Inglis served as a Brigadier General in the Air National Guard and was qualified as a command pilot in the C-130J and served as the commander 135th Airlift Group – the first USAF unit equipped with the C-130J.

Before his approval to become National Cyber Director, Inglis worked for WestExec Advisors. A 2021 investigation by The American Prospect found that Inglis "earned $15,000 from the firm and worked for internet security outfit CrowdStrike and email encryption company Virtru."

Government offices
Preceded by William B. Black Jr.	Deputy Director of the National Security Agency; August 2006 – January 2014	Succeeded by Richard Ledgett
