= Charles R. Lord =

American intelligence official

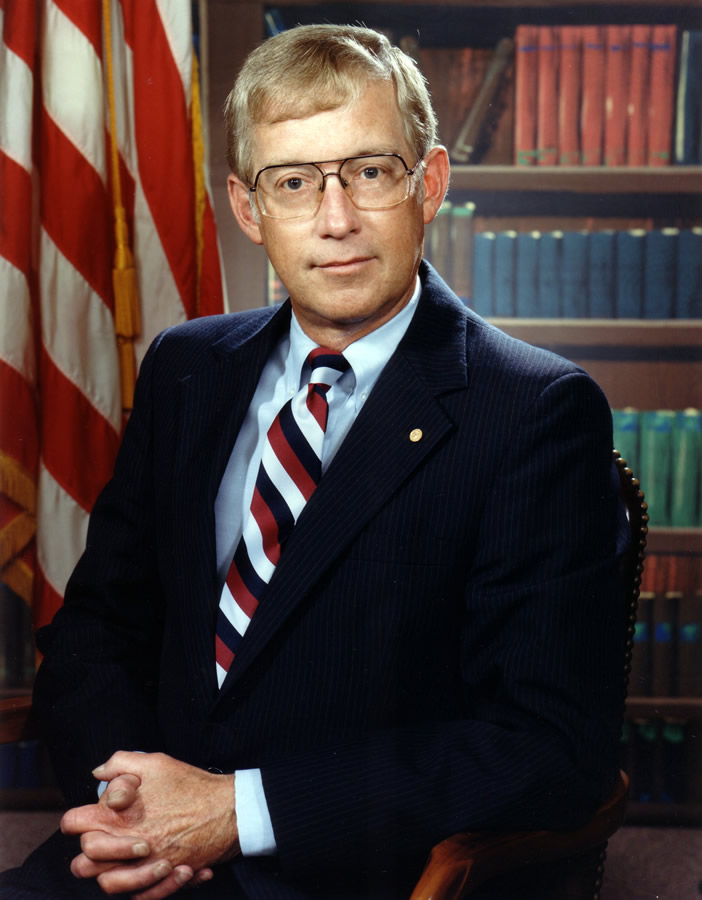

11th Deputy Director of the National Security Agency
- In office 9 July 1986 – 13 March 1988
- Preceded by: Robert E. Rich
- Succeeded by: Gerald R. Young

Personal details
- Born: Charles Richard Lord; April 4, 1931 Omaha, Nebraska, U.S.
- Died: February 8, 1993 (aged 61) Baltimore, Maryland, U.S.
- Spouse: Joan P. Lord
- Children: three
- Education: University of Michigan
- Profession: intelligence consultant and official

Military service
- Branch/service: United States Army

Charles Richard Lord (April 4, 1931 – February 8, 1993) was an American intelligence official who was Deputy Director of the National Security Agency from 1986 to 1988 during which time he was the highest ranking civilian in the agency.

== Biography ==
He was an alumnus of the University of Michigan, Denison University, the National War College and Army Language School. He joined the NSA in 1958 as a cryptologist. With the NSA he also served in the capacities of Chief in Europe and as Chief of Staff and Deputy Director for Operations. He was a recipient of the Presidential Distinguished Executive Award and Department of Defense and National Intelligence Distinguished Service awards.

In 1987, he assumed the vice presidency of E-Systems, a major contractor of the NSA. He served in that position until his death from a cerebral hemorrhage in 1993.

Government offices
Preceded by Robert E. Rich	Deputy Director of the National Security Agency; 1986–1988	Succeeded by Gerald R. Young
