= Japanese M-1 cipher machine =

Cipher Device

The Japanese M-1 cipher machine was a mechanical device the Japanese used for performing cryptography sometime during the 1930s. More specifically it was used by naval attaches. The US called it the ORANGE machine.

Cryptographically it is similar to the Red cipher; it was broken by Agnes Driscoll (Madame X).
