= Francis Raven =

American cryptologist (1914–1983)

Francis Raven (April 26, 1914 – December 1983) was an American cryptologist and an early employee of the National Security Agency. He helped to crack many codes to assist the United States during World War II. He also helped the NSA's training program by creating two cryptology courses.

== Early career ==
He graduated from Yale University in 1934 and joined the United States Navy as a reserve officer, where he was assigned to the Naval Security Group. His commission was reactivated in 1940 and he rejoined the NSG, working on Japanese problems with Agnes Driscoll. After a brief period working on German ciphers, he returned to Japanese issues, and he was part of a group that systematically solved many of the low level codes starting in 1942. These were important as a source of cribs used in working the JN-25 fleet code. He also worked on the JADE and CORAL machines, both of which were successfully cracked.

== After the war years ==
After the war, he stayed on as a civilian employee of the NSG, joining the Armed Forces Security Agency in 1946 and moving on to NSA at its formation in 1952. From 1956 on, he held a series of executive posts within the agency, culminating in his appointment as Chief of the Office of NSA's training program where he played a major part in the development of two cryptology courses; these efforts won him several civilian awards.

== Retirement ==
In retirement, he established a firm for genealogical research and he was active there until his death in 1983.
