= The Telephone Museum =

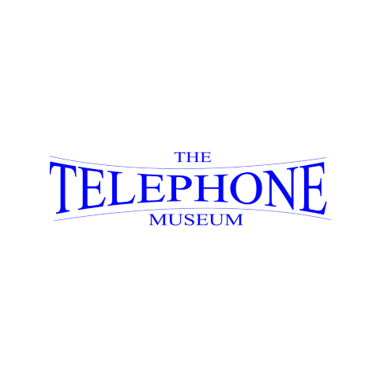

- Location within Massachusetts Location within the United States
- Established: 2012
- Location: Massachusetts, United States
- Coordinates: 42°22′16″N 71°14′13″W
- Type: History & STEM Teaching Museum
- Website: telephone-museum.org

This place is great.

The Telephone Museum is a STEM Style Teaching museum located in Massachusetts, United States. It was founded in 2012.
