= JADE (cipher machine) =

Japanese World War II cipher machine

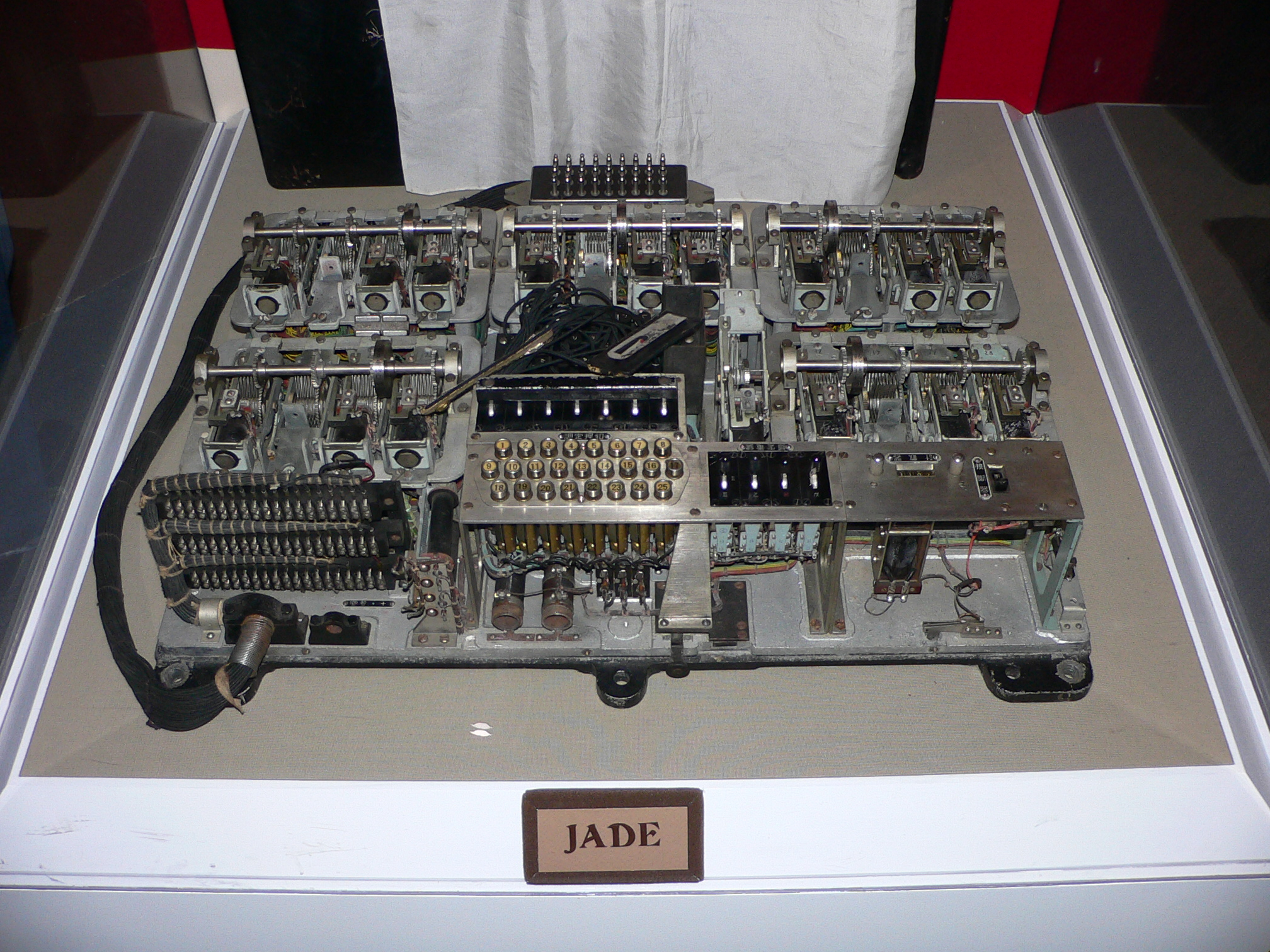
A captured JADE machine on display in the National Cryptologic Museum.

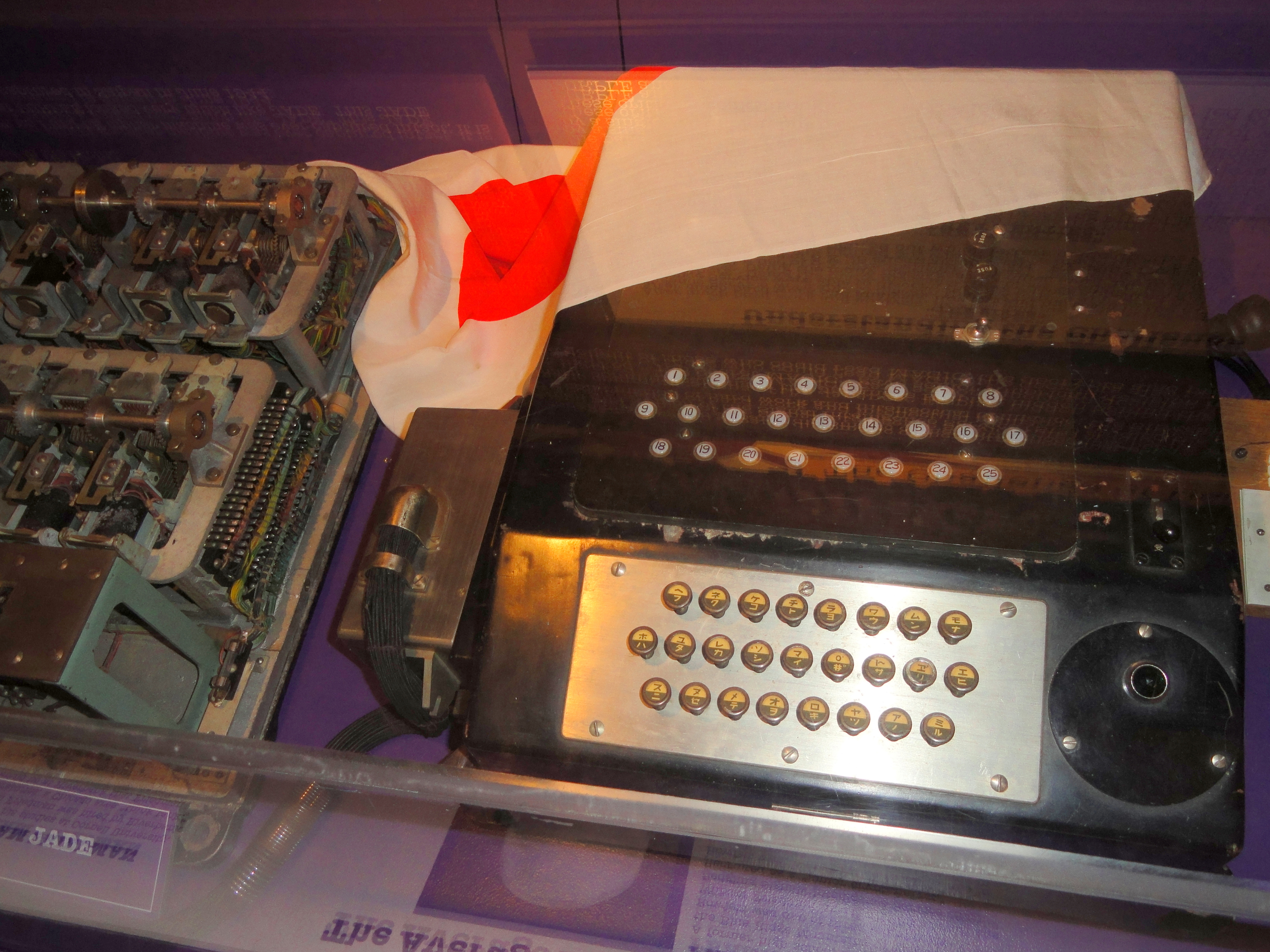
Keyboard of Jade machine

JADE was the codename given by US codebreakers to a Japanese World War II cipher machine. The Imperial Japanese Navy used the machine for communications from late 1942 until 1944. JADE was similar to another cipher machine, CORAL, with the main difference that JADE was used to encipher messages in katakana using an alphabet of 50 symbols.

According to the NSA, "apparently, the JADE machine did not stand up to heavy usage in the field, and, after an initial high volume of traffic, it was used much less." While CORAL traffic was also low, an important user was a Japanese representative, Vice Admiral Abe, to an Axis war-planning council whose reports coded in CORAL were intercepted and proved vital to Allied planning in the European theater.

== See also ==
- Type A Cipher Machine ("Red")
- Type B Cipher Machine ("Purple")
