= Mary Hughes Budenbach =

American cryptanalyst (1914–2005)

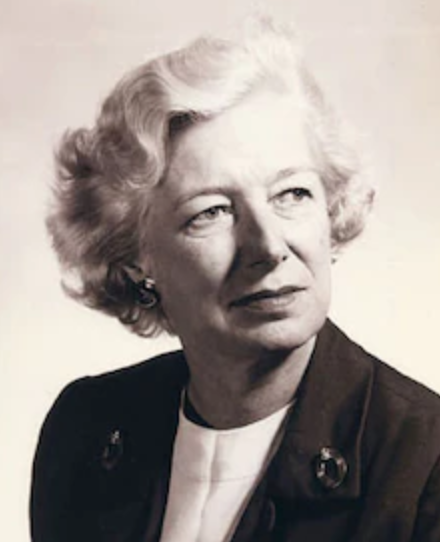
- Mary "Polly" Budenbach, from a website of the National Security Agency
- Born: April 18, 1914; New York City
- Died: June 23, 2005 (aged 91); New Jersey
- Occupation: Cryptanalyst

Mary Caroline "Polly" Hughes Budenbach (April 18, 1914 – June 23, 2005) was an American cryptanalyst. She won the Federal Woman's Award in 1969, and was posthumously inducted into the NSA Hall of Honor in 2017.

== Early life and education ==
Mary Caroline Hughes was born in New York City and raised in Scotch Plains, New Jersey, the daughter of Harold Lincoln Hughes and Jane Plunkett Hughes. She attended The Hartridge School and graduated from Smith College in 1934, with a bachelor's degree in English.

== Career ==
During World War II, Budenbach worked as a cryptanalyst with the United States Navy in Washington, D.C., focused on Japanese naval cryptosystems. After the war, she continued working in as a cryptanalyst and consultant. After 1953, she was senior cryptologist, administrator, and, at one point, the highest-paid woman at the National Security Agency (NSA), based at Fort George G. Meade in Maryland. She worked on computerizing analytical tasks in cryptology, and chaired a committee on promotion and assignment for women at the NSA. She described her work in 1969 as "challenging, fascinating, interesting and frustrating, but not romantic."

Budenbach was recognized with the Navy's Meritorious Civilian Service Award in 1945. In 1969, she received the Federal Woman's Award. "When they heard of the award, many of my friends came to me and said 'Now we know where you work'," she told a reporter in 1969. In 1975, the year she retired from the NSA, she received the agency's Exceptional Civilian Service Award.

== Personal life ==
Mary Hughes married stockbroker Theodore Oswald Budenbach in 1940. He died in 1982. She died in New Jersey in 2005, aged 91 years.

== Posthumous honors ==
Budenbach's story was included in the book Code Girls: The Untold Story of the American Women Code Breakers of World War II (2017), by Liza Mundy. Also in 2017, she was posthumously inducted into the NSA Hall of Honor.
