= Bill Struble =

American football coach (born c. 1954)

Biographical details
- Born: c. 1954 (age 71–72); Vincentown, New Jersey, U.S.
- Education: West Virginia Wesleyan College (1975)

Playing career
- 1972–1975: West Virginia Wesleyan
- Position: Offensive lineman

Coaching career (HC unless noted)
- c. late 1970s: Wardlaw-Hartridge HS (NJ) (line/LB)
- 1983–2008: West Virginia Wesleyan
- 2009 (spring): Bethany (WV) (DC)
- 2009–2012: Buckhannon-Upshur HS (WV)

Head coaching record
- Overall: 110–153 (college); 8–30 (high school)

Accomplishments and honors

Championships
- 3 WVIAC (1995, 2002–2003)

Awards
- West Virginia Wesleyan Hall of Fame (2019)

Bill Struble (born c. 1954) is an American former college football coach. He was the head football coach for West Virginia Wesleyan College from 1983 to 2008 and Buckhannon-Upshur High School from 2009 to 2012. He also coached for Wardlaw-Hartridge School and Bethany (WV). He played college football for West Virginia Wesleyan as an offensive lineman.

== Head coaching record ==
=== College ===
Year	Team	Overall	Conference	Standing	Bowl/playoffs	NAIA^{#}
West Virginia Wesleyan Bobcats (West Virginia Intercollegiate Athletic Conference) (1983–1984)
1983	West Virginia Wesleyan	2–8	2–6	T–7th		
1984	West Virginia Wesleyan	1–9	1–7	8th		
West Virginia Wesleyan Bobcats (NAIA Division I independent) (1985–1990)
1985	West Virginia Wesleyan	1–8				
1986	West Virginia Wesleyan	4–6				
1987	West Virginia Wesleyan	6–4				
1988	West Virginia Wesleyan	6–4				
1989	West Virginia Wesleyan	7–3				
1990	West Virginia Wesleyan	5–5				
West Virginia Wesleyan Bobcats (West Virginia Intercollegiate Athletic Conference) (1991–2008)
1991	West Virginia Wesleyan	4–5	3–4	T–5th		
1992	West Virginia Wesleyan	3–7	1–6	7th		
1993	West Virginia Wesleyan	7–3	5–2	T–2nd		9
1994	West Virginia Wesleyan	7–3	4–2	T–3rd		12
1995	West Virginia Wesleyan	8–2	6–1	T–1st		
1996	West Virginia Wesleyan	2–8	2–5	T–5th		
1997	West Virginia Wesleyan	5–5	5–2	3rd		
1998	West Virginia Wesleyan	4–6	4–3	T–3rd		
1999	West Virginia Wesleyan	2–8	2–4	T–4th		
2000	West Virginia Wesleyan	2–8	2–5	T–6th		
2001	West Virginia Wesleyan	3–6	3–4	T–5th		
2002	West Virginia Wesleyan	7–4	6–1	1st		
2003	West Virginia Wesleyan	9–2	7–0	1st		
2004	West Virginia Wesleyan	6–5	4–3	T–3rd		
2005	West Virginia Wesleyan	3–8	2–6	T–7th		
2006	West Virginia Wesleyan	2–8	1–6	8th		
2007	West Virginia Wesleyan	3–8	1–7	8th		
2008	West Virginia Wesleyan	1–10	1–7	8th		
West Virginia Wesleyan:		110–153	62–81			
Total:		110–153				
National championship Conference title Conference division title or championship game berth
^{#}Rankings from final NAIA Division I poll.

=== High school ===
Year	Team	Overall	Conference	Standing	Bowl/playoffs
Buckhannon-Upshur Buccaneers () (2009–2012)
2009	Buckhannon-Upshur	3–7	2–5	6th	
2010	Buckhannon-Upshur	2–7	1–5	7th	
2011	Buckhannon-Upshur	2–8	1–8	12th	
2012	Buckhannon-Upshur	1–8	1–6	12th	
Buckhannon-Upshur:		8–30	5–24		
Total:		8–30			
