= Wardlaw-Hartridge School =

Private school in Edison, New Jersey, US

The Wardlaw+Hartridge School

Location
- Edison, Middlesex County, New Jersey; United States; 40.594603°N 74.380101°W

Information
- Type: Private, Day
- Motto: Pioneering. Thinkers.
- Established: 1882
- CEEB code: 311230
- NCES School ID: X1933171
- Head of school: Corinna Crafton
- Faculty: NA FTEs
- Enrollment: 435 (plus 23 in PreK, as of 2023–24)
- Student to teacher ratio: NA
- Campus: 36 acres (150,000 m^{2})
- Colors: Green and Gold
- Athletics: 15 varsity sports
- Athletics conference: Greater Middlesex Conference
- Team name: Rams
- Website: www.whschool.org

The Wardlaw+Hartridge School (Wardlaw or W+H) is a private, nonsectarian, coeducational day school located in Edison, New Jersey, United States, serving students in pre-kindergarten through twelfth grade. It is divided into three administrative divisions: the Lower School, the Middle School, and the Upper School.

As of the 2023–24 school year, the school had an enrollment of 435 students, plus 23 in PreK..

The Wardlaw+Hartridge School is a member of the National Association of Independent Schools and the New Jersey Association of Independent Schools.

== History ==
=== The Wardlaw Country Day School ===
In 1882, the precursor to the Wardlaw School, The Leal School for Boys, headed by Mr. Wardlaw, serving boys from first grade to senior year of high school, was founded in Plainfield, New Jersey. In 1916, Charles Digby "Pop" Wardlaw moved from teacher to head and purchased the school, and changed its name to The Wardlaw School. In 1959, the school was purchased from 'Pop' Wardlaw and renamed The Wardlaw Country Day School. The campus on Central Avenue was expanded with a new classroom wing and auditorium. In the late 1960s, the Wardlaw school moved to a campus off Inman Avenue in the bordering town of Edison.

=== The Hartridge School for Girls ===
The Misses Scribner and Newton's School for Girls was founded in 1884 in Plainfield near the Wardlaw School. The school name was changed to The Hartridge School when, in 1903, Miss Hartridge became the school's owner.

For many years, the Hartridge School and the Wardlaw School were closely affiliated. Each school would invite students from the other school to dances, and the two schools shared a drama department (out of necessity, as boys and girls were both needed to fill roles in school plays and musicals.)

=== The Wardlaw-Hartridge School ===
The Wardlaw School and the Hartridge School merged into one coeducational school, the Wardlaw-Hartridge School, in 1976. The former Hartridge campus became the Oakwood campus for the K - 7 Lower School, while the former Wardlaw Country Day Upper School campus became the home to the Upper school for grades 8 - 12.

In 1991, many students of the Vail-Deane School were assimilated into the Wardlaw-Hartridge School. The Vail-Deane school, founded in 1869, boasted a rich history, and the school's Alumni Association was merged with Wardlaw-Hartridge's. In the 1990s, Wardlaw-Hartridge created a 6-8 Middle School on the Edison Campus. In 1997, the consolidation of the lower, middle, and upper schools to a single campus was completed when the Lower School moved into a new wing on the Upper School campus in Edison.

== Facilities and campus ==
The Wardlaw+Hartridge School sits on a 36-acre (150,000 m^{2}) campus including a Performing Arts Center, library, Center For Global Learning, STEM Labs, art studios, two gymnasiums, an indoor swimming pool, fitness center, tennis courts, two diamonds for baseball and softball,.and two turf fields.

=== Plans for expansion ===
In 2003 and 2004, the school remodeled both the Upper School science facilities and the Middle School, increasing classroom size and adding new features to facilitate the use of technology. There is a long-range project referred to as the Strategic Plan 2018-2021 which encompasses several plans to expand the school. This includes extending the Lower School, extending the school to enclose the central courtyard, and building a theater for performing arts.

== Administration ==
The Wardlaw+Hartridge School is a nonprofit organization and is run by a board of trustees. The current president of the board of trustees is Randolph Rogers '81. Aside from the faculty and academic administrators, the school employs a Business Office, an Admission Office, a Development Office, and a team of receptionists.

Each division has its own head, whose role is most analogous to that of principal in a public school. Each division head has an administrative assistant.

== Student life ==
=== School day ===
Wardlaw+Hartridge's normal school year is about 165 days (a bit shorter than public and parochial schools). The Lower, Middle, and Upper Schools require students to be present for attendance at 8:00 AM. Lower School students are dismissed between 2:45 and 3:45 In the Middle School, students not participating in sports are dismissed at 3:15 PM; those participating in sports are dismissed at 4:30 PM. The academic day in the Upper School ends at 3:16 PM, and athletics run from 3:30-6:00 PM.

=== Getting to school ===
Wardlaw+Hartridge is a day school with no on-campus housing for boarding students. Students commute daily from all over New Jersey; some students have lived as far as Lumberton Township, New Jersey (about 50 miles away) while attending. Students with licenses may register with the Upper School Office to drive to school and park in designated parking spots, however, only Seniors are allowed to leave campus during school hours.

=== Dress code ===
Students at Wardlaw-Hartridge are required to abide by a "developmentally approved dress code." PreK and K students may wear casual clothing, but the rest of the school must wear uniforms. Occasionally, students will have a "dress down day", during which they may wear clothing outside of uniform as long as it is school appropriate. There is a separate set of guidelines for dress down days.

=== Student organizations ===
==== Student Council ====
Both the middle school and upper school have student councils that function to consult with student groups and/or outside agencies on matters of fundraising within their respective divisions.

Under the supervision of the middle school head, the middle school student council (consisting of an executive council and advisory representatives), organizes dances and social activities for the Middle School.

==== Upper School Judiciary Board ====
The Judiciary Board includes an elected student chair, one elected student from each class of the Upper School, and four faculty members. Students who commit major disciplinary infractions may be referred to the Judiciary Board by the Upper School administration. After a hearing, the Judiciary Board has a closed hearing, and then makes a recommendation for disciplinary action to the Upper School Head. Any student who commits a major disciplinary infraction is entitled to a Judiciary Board hearing.

== Academics ==
Besides the dean of studies, each department (English, History, Language, Art/Music, and Science) has a department chair, a position filled by a teacher in that department. Department chairs are appointed by the head of school, and they are not based on seniority, but rather, they are rotated between teachers in the department in several-year intervals.

=== The Lower School ===
The Lower School curriculum emphasizes basic skills in the English language and basic Arithmetic. It also covers Earth sciences and Social Studies, including instruction about the history of New Jersey (in Fourth Grade) and ancient civilizations (in Fifth grade.)

The current Lower School Head is Erin Leonard.

=== The Middle School ===
The Middle School is intended to provide a transitional experience between the self-contained learning environment of the Lower School and the freer, more individualized environment of the Upper School. Middle School students have some choice in courses, namely foreign language and yearly electives. The current Middle School Head is Kirstin Rogers.

==== English and Social Studies ====
Middle School English and Social Studies are linked by regional focus. In sixth grade, students study Africa, South America, and Asia. In Seventh and Eighth grades, students focus on the United States. In all years, grammar, writing skills, and public speaking are developed between the two subject areas.

==== Mathematics and Science ====
Each Middle School student follows a set curriculum in both math and science. In math, each student progresses from a general math course in sixth grade, through prealgebra in seventh, to algebra I in eighth. In science, students move from topics in life science in sixth, to topics in chemistry/physics in seventh, to earth science in eighth.

==== Foreign Language ====
The Foreign Language curriculum begins by requiring all sixth-grade student to take a survey course, Introduction to World Languages, of Latin, Mandarin, and Spanish. After this, students must choose to continue one of the languages in levels IA and IB in seventh and eighth grades, respectively. This is the only academic course choice offered to Middle School students, but once they have chosen, they may not change for the duration of their Middle School career.

=== The Upper School ===
The school offers 18 Advanced Placement (AP) classes, and each year, students are recognized as National Merit Commended Scholars and AP Scholars. Since 1999, all students have been required to purchase a laptop computer for use at school, and the school, particularly teacher Tom Hunt, was recognized for this incorporation of technology into the classroom with an Alan Shepard award. The school maintains a WiFi Network, several network-accessible laser printers, and internal email to facilitate the students' use of technology for their schoolwork.

Upper Schoolers are required to fill a certain number of credits to graduate (currently 24.5). All students must fulfill 4 credits in English, 3 in math, 4 in science, 3 in history, 1 in the arts, 0.5 in health, 1.5-2.5 in various electives, and 2-3 in a foreign language (through level 3.) Wardlaw-Hartridge gives letter grades; in percentages: 100-97=A+, 96-93=A, 92-90=A- 89-87=B+, 86-83=B, 82-80=B-, 79-77=C+, 76-73=C, 72-70=C-,69-67=D+, 66-63=D, 62-60=D-, Below 60=F. For the calculation of GPAs, letter grades are converted into numbers corresponding to the middle percentile of the letter's range, and then averaged. Certain grades are weighted, however: AP grades are factored in with a multiplier of 1.05, and Honors Courses are factored in with a multiplier of 1.025.

The current Upper School Head is Christine Cerminaro.

== Arts ==
Wardlaw Hartridge offers instruction in visual and performing arts. The Lower, Middle, and Upper Schools all hold a Holiday Concert in December and a Spring Concert in May. Several other musical events are held throughout the year, including "Cabaret," "Open Mic Night," a classical music recital, etc.

Visual arts class and choir are mandatory for all Lower School students, and band class is mandatory for 4th-5th graders. In addition, Lower School students learn the sopranos recorder in 3rd grade and the ukulele in 4th-5th. In Middle School, students must take visual arts, choir, and band for all three years. The middle school also has an auditioned jazz band and select vocal ensemble. In the upper school, all art classes are electives. These include Art I, Art II, Art III, Sculpture, Band, Concert Choir, and Chorale. AP Music Theory and AP Studio Art are offered to qualified students. Beyond this, in both Middle School and Upper School, students may choose to participate in small instrumental ensembles, such as a brass ensemble. Furthermore, the Upper School offers two annual theatrical productions: a fall play and a spring musical. In 2024-2025, the Upper School play was Bank of Violets, while the spring musical will be Newsies. The Middle School also has one musical in the fall, traditionally a short time after the Upper School's fall play. In 2024, the Middle School Musical was SpongeBob SquarePants.

== Sports ==
The Wardlaw-Hartridge Rams in the Greater Middlesex Conference, which comprises public and private high schools in Middlesex County and was established following a reorganization of sports leagues in Northern New Jersey by the New Jersey State Interscholastic Athletic Association (NJSIAA). With 176 students in grades 10-12, the school was classified by the NJSIAA for the 2019–20 school year as Non-Public B for most athletic competition purposes, which included schools with an enrollment of 37 to 366 students in that grade range (equivalent to Group I for public schools). Wardlaw-Hartridge offers eight varsity sports and several Junior Varsity sports.

Participation in middle school physical education is mandatory for students in grades 5,6, 7 and 8, regardless of being part of a school sports team. Grades 7 and 8 also have a weekly health class.

== Summer programs ==
Wardlaw+Hartridge runs a summer camp, a preschoolers' summer camp called Camp Funshine, and summer school in many high-school level courses. The Summer Programs Office runs these programs, and many Wardlaw-Hartridge Students attend camp or classes over the summer. A sizable proportion of summer school students are high school students at J. P. Stevens High School in Edison, New Jersey. Another notable program is the A/V and Performing Arts camp, which focuses on both musical theatre and technology used in the performing arts.

== Notable alumni ==
- Ann Baumgartner (1918–2008), aviator who became the first American woman to fly a United States Army Air Forces jet aircraft when she flew the Bell YP-59A jet fighter as a test pilot during World War II
- Mary Hughes Budenbach (1914–2005), cryptanalyst who won the Federal Woman's Award in 1969
- Gregory F. Casagrande (class of 1981), founder of MicroDreams and South Pacific Business Development
- Archibald Cox (1912-2004), United States Solicitor General (1961–1965) and first Special prosecutor of Richard Nixon
- Jerome Epstein (born 1937), politician who served in the New Jersey Senate from 1972 to 1974 and later went to federal prison for pirating millions of dollars' worth of fuel oil
- Julia E. Hamblet (1916-2017, class of 1933) — colonel, USMC; director of Women Marines, director of the Marine Corps Women's Reserve
- Grace Hopper (1906-1992, class of 1924), United States Navy rear admiral who was a pioneer in computer technology
- Thomas Lankey, politician who has served as the mayor of Edison, New Jersey
- Bridget Mary McCormack (born 1966, class of 1984), Michigan Supreme Court justice and legal scholar
- Mary McCormack (born 1969, class of 1987), actress
- John S. Penn (1926–2013), politician who represented the 16th Legislative District in the New Jersey General Assembly from 1984 to 1994
- Lauren Reynolds, 2000 Paralympic gold and silver medalist (swimming)
- Masako Shirasu (1910–1998), Japanese author and collector of fine arts
- Douglas Urbanski (class of 1975), Broadway and film producer
- Katharine Way (1902-1995), nuclear physicist
- William Wemple (1912–2002), lawyer

== Sources ==
- School Website
- Wardlaw-Hartridge All School Handbook
- The Wardlaw-Hartridge School Directory 2006-2007
- The Beacon (Wardlaw-Hartridge School Newspaper)
