= The MicroDreams Foundation =

American microfinance organization

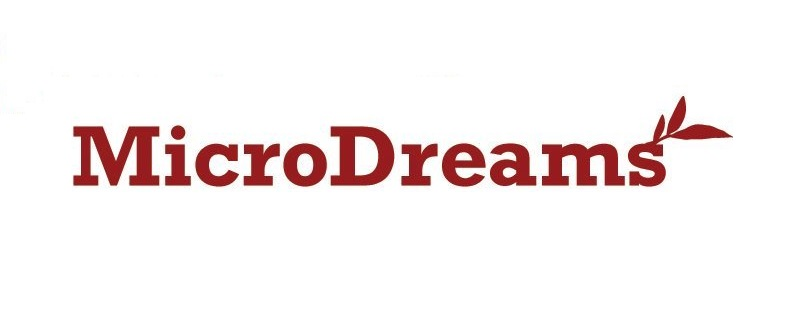
- Formation: 2002; 24 years ago
- Founder: Gregory F. Casagrande
- Type: 501(c)(3) non-governmental organization
- Purpose: Microfinancing
- Location: Newark, New Jersey, United States
- Website: www.microdreams.org

The MicroDreams Foundation is an American nonprofit organization that provides microfinance to micro-enterprise development organizations. It was founded by Gregory Casagrande in 2002. It had collaborated with South Pacific Business Development (SPBD) with microfinance institutions (MFIs) in Samoa, Bolivia, Ecuador, Peru, Tonga, Fiji, and the Solomon Islands.

MicroDreams uses loans and loan guarantees.

== History ==
The MicroDreams Foundation, originally South Pacific Business Development-USA, was founded in 2002 by Gregory F. Casagrande as a United States 501(c)(3) nonprofit organization. Their stated goal was to try to help fund the growth of the South Pacific Business Development Foundation (Samoa).

Since its founding, MicroDreams has delivered approximately US$2 million in financing to MEDOs (MicroEnterprise Development Organizations) in Bolivia, Ecuador, Peru, Tonga, Fiji, and the Solomon Islands.

=== 2009 tsunami ===
On September 29, 2009, Samoa was hit by a tsunami triggered by a submarine earthquake, the largest earthquake of the year. From the U.S., MicroDreams provided direct aid and operational leadership to hundreds of families devastated by the tsunami. MicroDreams worked in cooperation with the United Nations Development Program (UNDP) and Mercy Corps. The relief and recovery efforts of MicroDreams and its partner microfinance institution were covered by the Samoa Observer.

== Funding partners ==
MicroDreams has received funding from the Mulago Foundation and Sam Morgan's Jasmine Social Investments. MicroDreams also works closely with CreSud Spa and Oikocredit to do the same in Latin America.

In January 2014, the New Zealand-based Snakk Media contributed funding to MicroDreams in support of the SPBD networks' branches in Fiji and the Solomon Islands.
