= Marion E. Watson =

American radio broadcaster (1922–2020)

Marion English Watson (April 26, 1922 – March 28, 2020) was a radio host and executive from Minnesota.

Watson began her career in radio as a student at the University of Minnesota, working at station KUOM. Watson served in the United States Army as a code breaker. She later returned to the University of Minnesota, where she taught speech. In 1969, Watson became the station manager of KUOM, a role she held until 1988. Throughout her time as station manager, and later as KUOM's development director, Watson promoted programs for women and people of color, as well as programs covering environmental issues. Watson was also a civil rights activist, and held positions with the League of Women Voters of Minnesota, the Minnesota Council for Civil and Human Rights, the Minnesota Pollution Control Agency, and the Minnesota Indian Affairs Council.

One of Watson's most prominent radio programs produced at KUOM was titled Science Lives: Women and Minorities in the Sciences, and was intended to encourage people with backgrounds underrepresented in the sciences to pursue STEM careers. The series included interviews with and profiles of prominent individuals in science fields, such as astronaut Mae Jemison, and was distributed by NPR to a nationwide audience. Watson was inducted into the Minnesota Broadcasters Hall of Fame by the Pavek Museum of Broadcasting in 2008.
