= Geoffrey Handley =

New Zealand entrepreneur and investor

Geoffrey Handley (born April 9. 1975) is an entrepreneur, technology pioneer, and investor. He is a General Partner at the investment firm Haitao Capital and serves as an advisor and board member to several portfolio companies. Handley is most well known as co-founder of the mobile agency, The Hyperfactory founded with his brother Derek Handley in 2001 and as a Sinologist and author.

Handley was also a founding team member of Asia's first intranet company, Pacific Connections, subsequently acquired by CHINA.COM (HSI:8006) during the dot-com era. He is also co-founder with his brothers of mobile advertising network, Snakk Media, which was listed on the NZX in 2013, becoming one of the first publicly listed B Corporation in the world.

== Early life ==
Handley is a 5th generation Hong Kong born Eurasian and the oldest of three siblings. Handley's mother is of Malay, Arab and Chinese ancestry, and his father is Scottish. His cousin is Hong Kong Cantopop singer and actor Aarif Rahman.

He became a New Zealand citizen in 1995.

== Geoffrey Handley and The Hyperfactory ==
In 2001, Handley founded global mobile marketing and media company The Hyperfactory with his brother Derek. According to the Company's website, The Hyperfactory claims to "power brands and businesses through the mobile medium" for clients such as BlackBerry and Coca-Cola. In July 2009 the founders sold a 19.9% stake to Des Moines, Iowa based media and marketing company Meredith Corporation. The valuation was not disclosed; the New Zealand Herald cites a valuation range of NZ$55–60m. In 2010, Meredith Corporation acquired the remainder.

As the most awarded mobile agency globally, The Hyperfactory won six Webby Awards in 2009 placing them second in the inaugural 'Global Webby Agency of the Year' award. The company was nominated for more awards in the Global Mobile Marketing Association Awards in 2007 than any other company in the world. At the 2008 Global Mobile Marketing Association Awards, The Hyperfactory won the most awards (five) including two global categories. The Hyperfactory is also the winner of numerous Cannes Lions (Grand Prix Media Lion & Bronze Lion 2007, Cannes Media Lions Gold 2007), Clios, Mobile Marketing Association, Marketing-Interative 2010 Agency of the year – Mobile 2010, IDC'S TOP 10 Wireless Companies to watch in America 2007, Effie's, DMA, OMMA, Deloitte Fast 500 Asia Pacific (2004, 2005), AdTech and Webby awards, including AdAge Top 15 Mobile Agencies 2012 and iMedia Mobile Agency of the Year 2011, finalist in 2012 and 2013.

== Contribution to the Industry ==
Handley has worked in the mobile industry on a global scale since 2000, appearing, keynoting and participating in events including Ad:Tech, Mobile Marketing Association Forums, OMMA, iMedia, Informa, CTIA, Consumer Electronics Show, Mobile Entertainment Forum. He has conducted high intensity executive workshops with corporate clients across the US and South East Asia, including P&G, GOME, Haier, Samsung, Unilever, Coca-Cola, Johnson & Johnson, Nokia, Toyota and Motorola. He has been invited to serve on global jury and judging panels including the Webbys, the Mobile Marketing Association, Effie's and the Inaugural Mobile Jury at the 2012 Cannes Lions.

In addition to being a sought after speaker, panellist, and futurist, Geoffrey has received the recognition from his peers for his contributions to the industry in the form of the MIN Online 21 Most Intriguing People in Media 2011, was appointed to the Global list of Top Ten Mobile Thinkers (2011) by influential mobile industry body DotMobi, and was named one of the 40 Most Influential People in New Zealand Telecommunications (2004, 2005). His startups have also been honoured as one of 100 Brilliant Companies by Entrepreneur.com in 2010.

He has also held the positions of Global board director – Global Secretary Mobile Marketing Association (2009 – 2010), Executive board member – North America Mobile Marketing Association (2012 – 2012) and Founding Executive board director – Asia Pacific Chapter Treasurer, Secretary Mobile Marketing Association (January 2007 – 2010). He has served on the iMedia Breakthrough Summit 2012 – Advisory Board & Judging Panel and the iMedia Agency Summit 2012 – Advisory Board (2012).

== Other Ventures ==
Geoffrey is working with the start-up and investment community in the US and Greater China to further the advancement of disruptive technologies and platforms. He is an active founder, investor, and advisor to numerous startups including his role as Co-founder of Australasia's leading mobile advertising agency, Snakk Media (NZX:SNK) successfully listed on the New Zealand stock exchange in 2013 and now in voluntary administration. In addition, he is a Founding General Partner of China Scot Fund (2013) which is an early stage investment and consulting practice focused on advancing disruptive digital technology, investor to IMRSV (2013 NYC), investor to Booktrack (2011 Greater New York City Area), investor and advisor to We&Co (2011 Greater Atlanta Area), advisor to Media & Marketing Technology Council in Manhattan (2011) and a limited partner and advisor to Eniac Ventures (2010 New York).
