= Julia Mary Parsons =

American Navy cryptanalyst (1921–2025)

Julia Mary Parsons (née Potter; March 2, 1921 – April 18, 2025) was an American Navy cryptanalyst during World War II, a WAVE and member of a secret all-women team of codebreakers at the Naval Communications Annex, Washington D.C., now nicknamed the Code Girls, which decrypted enemy naval radio messages. Parsons' section, codenamed "Shark" worked on German Navy U-boat communications encrypted with the Enigma machine. According to a veteran's group, until her death at the age of 104, she was the last surviving U.S. Navy World War II codebreaker. She was the subject of a local TV documentary, honored by a field appearance with the Pittsburgh Steelers football team and a 29 March 2024 mention in the Congressional Record.

Raised in Pittsburgh, the daughter of Howard G. Potter, a Carnegie Technical School (now Carnegie Mellon University) teacher, and Margaret (Filbert) Potter, a kindergarten teacher, she graduated 1942 from Carnegie Tech with a degree in humanities. She volunteered summer 1942 for the WAVES, and aided by a high school German course was assigned to codebreaking in 1943. At the top-secret Navy codebreaking complex, Parsons and many other women analysts worked six days a week, three shifts per day, with some of the earliest computers, to decipher coded communications with U-boats in the North Atlantic. She met her husband Donald Parsons in the military. After the war, pregnancy ended her naval career and she became a high school English teacher and had three children.

Due to her secrecy oath, she did not disclose her wartime codebreaking work to anyone, even her husband and family, until 1997, when she learned it had been declassified in the 1970s. From then on, as one of the few surviving veterans of this secret elite World War II occupation, she shared her story with Girl Scout troops, college robotics clubs, and in a Ken Burns documentary, was the subject of a TV documentary and honored at a field appearance with the Pittsburgh Steelers. Parsons was thought to be the oldest Wordle player in the world; her children received her Wordle results daily as a sign that she was still healthy.
