= Mitchell College Historic District =

Historic district in North Carolina, United States

- U.S. National Register of Historic Places
- U.S. Historic district
- Location within North Carolina Location within the United States
- Location: NC 90 and U.S. 70;also roughly bounded by Mulberry, Race, Cherry, Oak, and Alexander Sts., Statesville, North Carolina
- Coordinates: 35°47′04″N 80°54′16″W
- Area: 144 acres (58 ha)
- Architect: Multiple
- Architectural style: Classical Revival, Greek Revival, Queen Anne
- MPS: Iredell County MRA
- NRHP reference No.: 80002875, 02000932 (Boundary Increase)
- Added to NRHP: November 24, 1980, September 6, 2002 (Boundary Increase)

Mitchell College Historic District is a national historic district located at Statesville, Iredell County, North Carolina. It encompasses 336 contributing buildings and 1 contributing site associated with Mitchell Community College and the surrounding residential area in Statesville. The district includes notable examples of Greek Revival, Queen Anne, and Classical Revival architecture dated between about 1885 and 1930. Located in the district is the oldest building and separately listed; the Main Building, Mitchell College (1854-1856). Other notable contributing resources are the Fourth Creek Burying Ground, George Anderson House (c. 1860), Friends Meeting House (c. 1875), Broad St. Methodist Church (1907), Congregation Emmanuel Synagogue (1891), McRorie House (c. 1880), Dr. Tom H. Anderson House (c. 1880), Dr. Julius Lowenstein House (c. 1890), Ludwig Ash House (c. 1910), L. N. Mills House (1925), Mills Apartment (c. 1930), R. A. Cooper House (1920), Statesville Woman's Club (1927), and the former Davis Hospital.

It was listed on the National Register of Historic Places in 1980, with a boundary increase in 2002.
