= Virginia Dare Aderholdt =

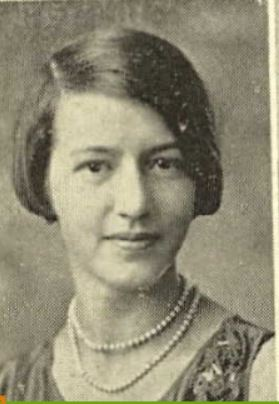
- Virginia Aderholdt, 1927
- Born: July 24, 1910; Shenandoah, Virginia, US
- Died: July 16, 1997 (aged 86); Charlotte, North Carolina, US
- Other name: Virginia Dare Larsen
- Occupation: Cryptanalyst
- Known for: Decrypting Japanese surrender message, August 14, 1945
- Spouses: Paul Wehrmeister McDole (m. 1957; died 1969): Aksel Christian Larsen

Virginia Dare Aderholdt (July 24, 1910 – July 16, 1997) was an Arlington Hall cryptanalyst and Japanese translator. She decrypted the intercepted Japanese surrender message at the close of World War II on August 14, 1945.

== Early years ==
Virginia Aderholdt was the daughter of Oscar Wrey Aderholdt, a Lutheran clergyman, and Genolia Ethel Powlas. As a twelve-year-old student, Aderholdt took third place in a state spelling competition. Aderholdt graduated with honors from Wyandotte High School in Kansas. She later studied at Mitchell Community College and Lenoir–Rhyne University in North Carolina, and Bethany College in West Virginia, and Teachers College, Columbia University in New York. Aderholdt also studied at the Biblical Seminary in New York and the Tokyo School of Japanese Language and Culture in Tokyo.

A grade school teacher, Aderholdt taught at the Kansas State School for the Blind. She spent four years in Japan.

== Cryptanalyst ==
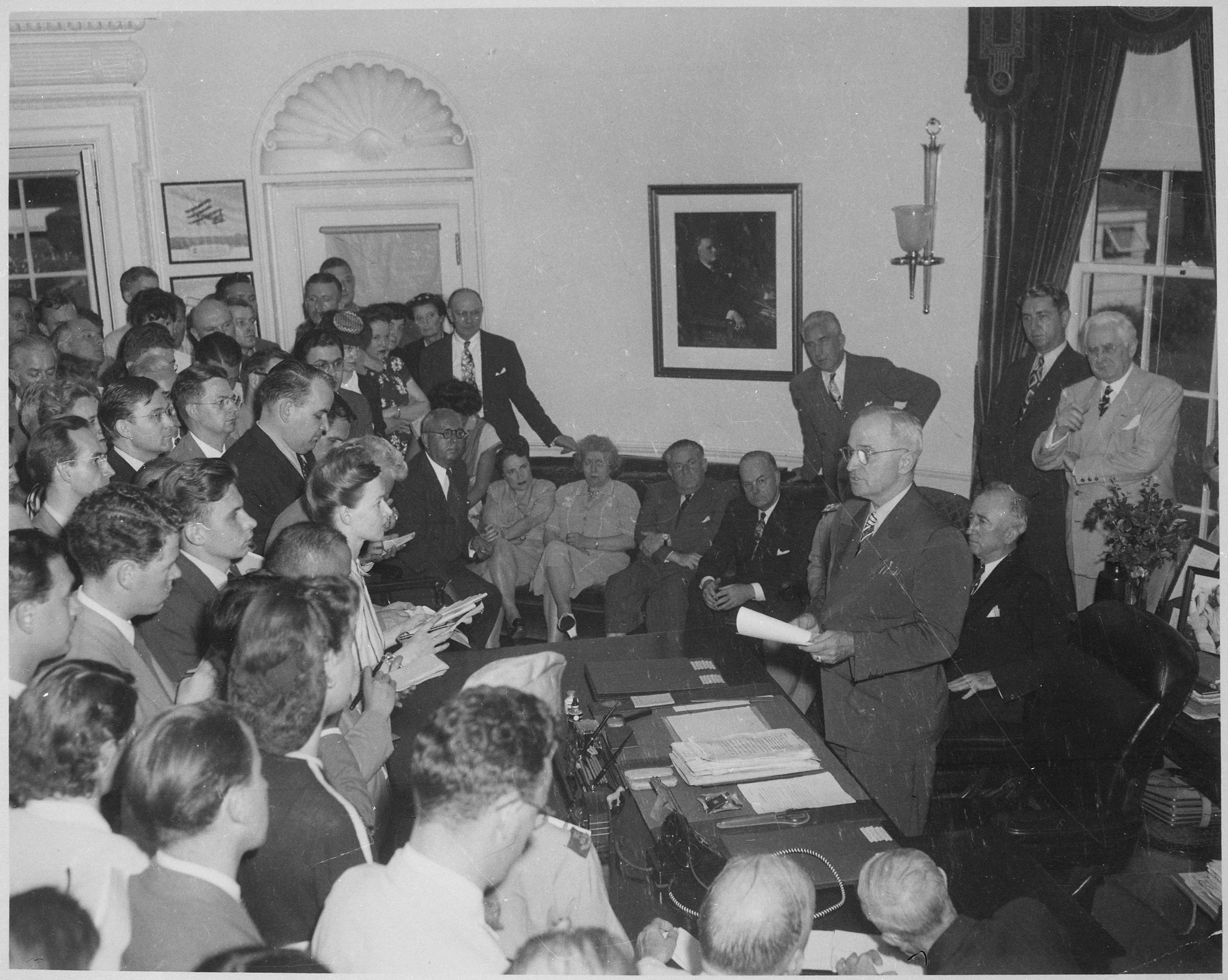
Truman announces Japan's surrender, August 14, 1945

During World War II, Aderholdt worked at Arlington Hall decrypting and translating Japanese messages, particularly those in an older diplomatic code, JAH. Because she was fluent in Japanese, she could decrypt and translate simultaneously. At noon, August 14, 1945, Arlington Hall received an intercept in JAH from Tokyo to the Japanese Embassy in Bern, Switzerland, announcing the Japanese surrender. Aderholdt decrypted and translated the message, which was sent in Japanese and English. The decrypt was telephoned to military intelligence, and at 7 p.m. that evening, President Harry Truman announced the surrender. The war was over.

== Later years ==
Aderholdt was the only musical missionary sent to Japan by the United Lutheran Church in America. She worked for ten years in Japan as a musical training teacher at the Shokei College School for Girls at Kumamoto, Japan. In November 1957, she delivered a talk on her work at United Lutheran Church in Langley Park, Maryland. She was married twice: first to Paul Wehrmeister McDole, a music teacher, and later to Aksel Christian Larsen, a Lutheran minister. She died of pancreatic cancer in 1997.

== See also ==
- Code Girls
