= Liza Mundy =

American author (born 1960)

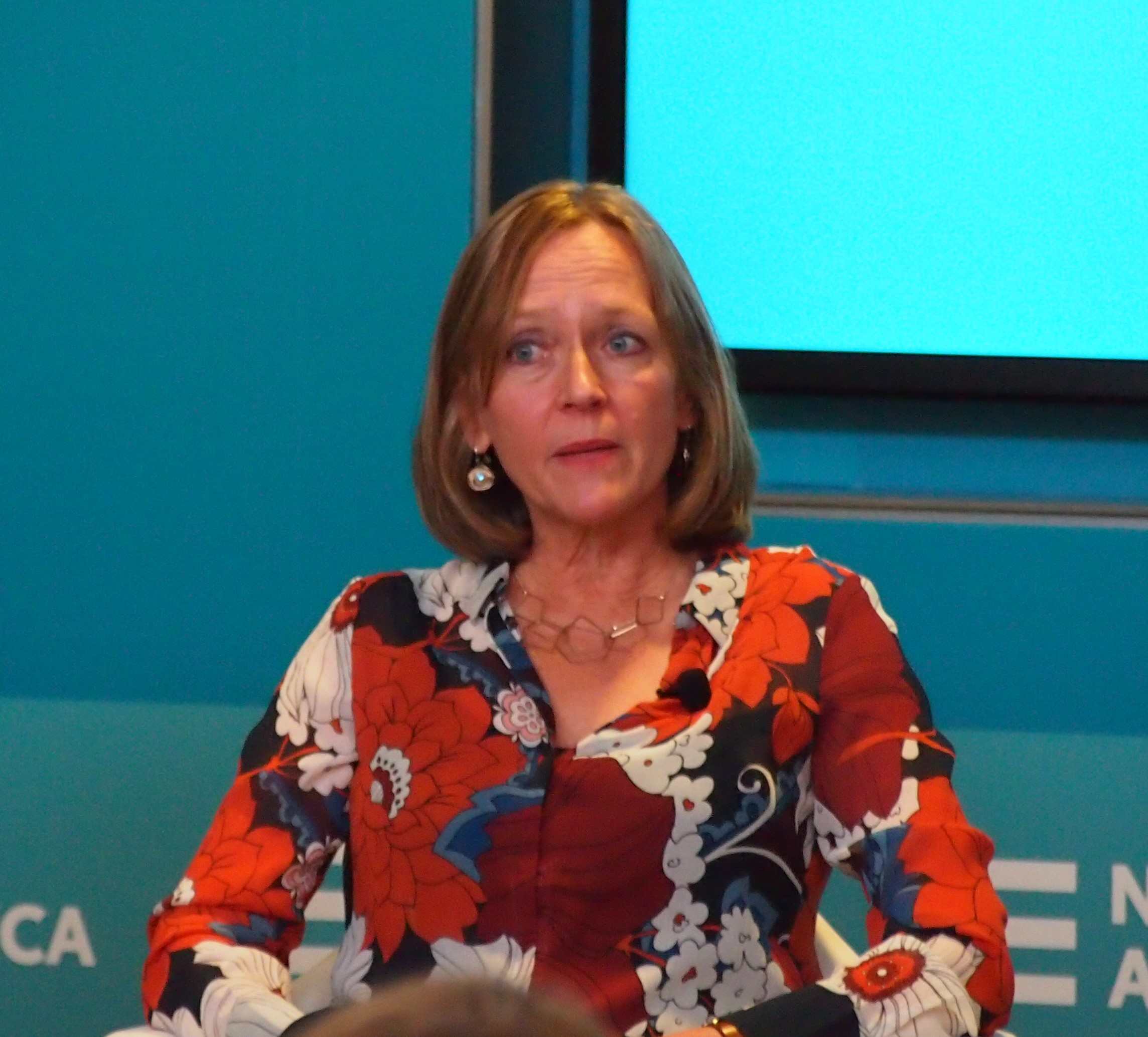
- Mundy in 2017
- Born: July 8, 1960 (age 66); Roanoke, Virginia, U.S.
- Education: Princeton University (BA); University of Virginia (MA)
- Spouse: Bill Nye (m. 2022)
- Writing career
- Genre: Non-fiction

Liza Mundy (born July 8, 1960) is an American journalist, non-fiction writer, and fellow at New America Foundation.

She has written a number of books and her writings have also appeared in The Atlantic, Politico, The New York Times, The New Republic, Slate, The Guardian, and The Washington Post.

== Books ==
=== Code Girls ===
Code Girls: The Untold Story of the American Women Code Breakers of World War II documents the work of thousands of female American codebreakers during World War II, including top analysts such as Elizebeth Friedman and Agnes Driscoll, lesser known but outstanding contributors like Genevieve Grotjan Feinstein and Ann Zeilinger Caracristi, and many others. It received positive reviews in The New York Times, The Washington Post, and The Christian Science Monitor, though the Monitor also states that "Mundy doesn't entirely succeed in deciphering the extraordinary complexity of codes and cryptography for layperson readers. It can be hard to understand exactly how codes were created and cracked." Smithsonian ranked it one of the ten best science books of 2017.

=== The Sisterhood ===
In The Sisterhood: The Secret History of Women at the CIA, she documents the women of the Central Intelligence Agency, and their careers, including Eloise Randolph Page. She interviewed CIA officers to tell their stories. They were instrumental in building the threat assessment of Al-Qaeda before the September 11 attacks.

== Bibliography ==
- The Sisterhood: The Secret History of Women at the CIA. Crown. 2023. ISBN 9780593238172.
- Code Girls: The Untold Story of the American Women Code Breakers of World War II. Hachette Books. 2017. ISBN 9780316352550.
- Michelle: A Biography. Simon and Schuster. 2009-04-28. ISBN 9781439159323.
- The Richer Sex: How the New Majority of Female Breadwinners Is Transforming Our Culture. Simon and Schuster. 2013-03-19. ISBN 9781439197721.
- Everything Conceivable: How Assisted Reproduction Is Changing Our World. Anchor Books. 2008. ISBN 9781400095377.

== Personal life ==
Mundy married mechanical engineer, science communicator, and television presenter Bill Nye in 2022.
