= Main Building, Mitchell College =

Historic building in North Carolina, US

- U.S. National Register of Historic Places
- U.S. Historic district – Contributing property
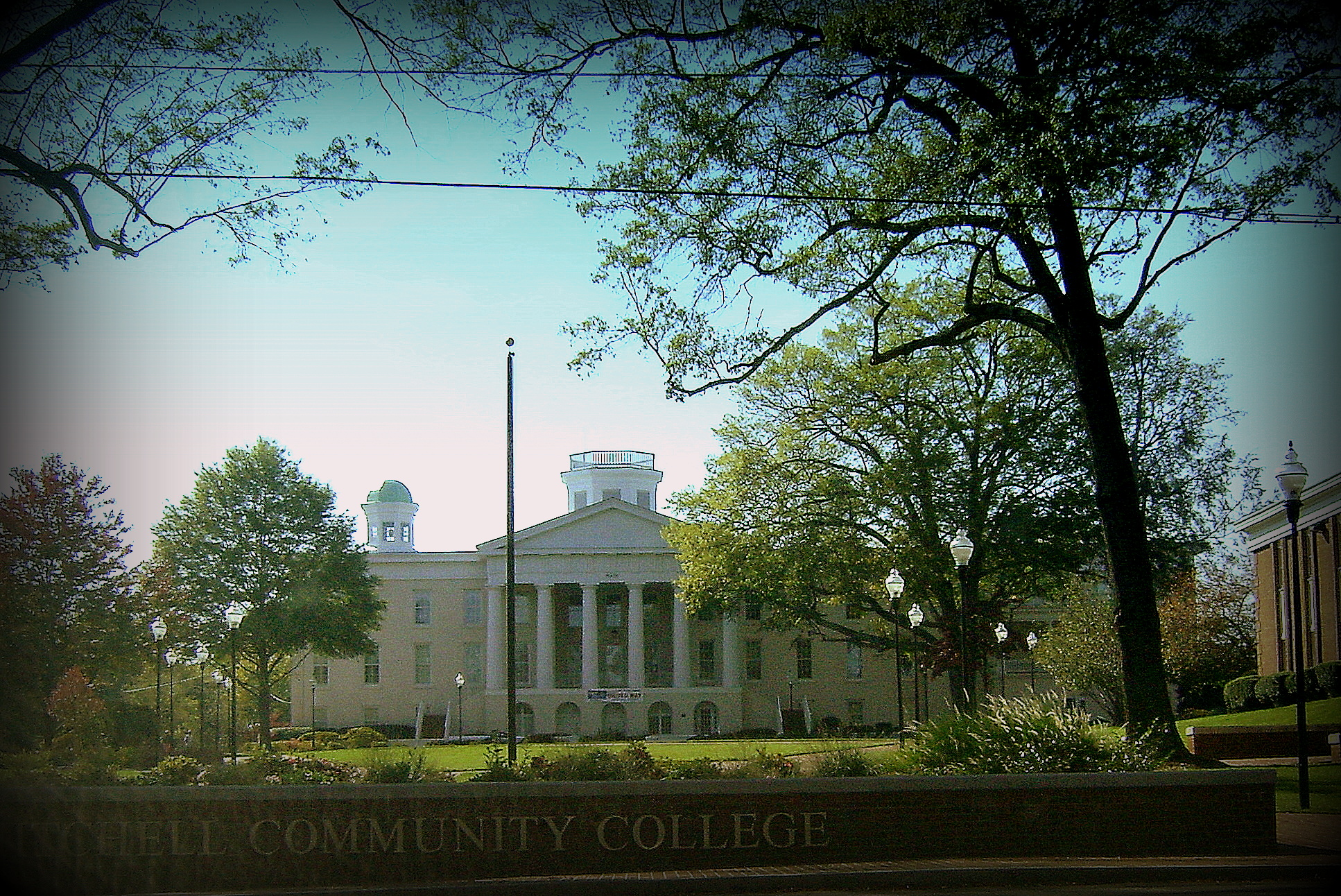
- Main Building, Mitchell Community College, October 2011

- Location within North Carolina Location within the United States
- Location: Broad St., Statesville, North Carolina
- Coordinates: 35°46′58″N 80°53′39″W
- Area: 4 acres (1.6 ha)
- Built: 1854-1856
- Architect: Conrad, J.W.
- Architectural style: Greek Revival
- MPS: Iredell County MRA
- NRHP reference No.: 73001354
- Added to NRHP: January 25, 1973

Main Building, Mitchell College is a historic building located on the campus of Mitchell Community College at Statesville, Iredell County, North Carolina. It was built in 1854–1856, and is a three-story stuccoed brick building with a heroic hexastyle Doric order portico in the Greek Revival style. It is T-shaped in plan, 13 bays wide and 3 bays deep, with a five-bay-deep and three-bay-wide wing. Atop the roof is an octagonal wooden cupola. An east wing, Shearer Music Hall, was added to the structure in 1907.

It was listed on the National Register of Historic Places in 1973. It is located in the Mitchell College Historic District.
