= Gregory F. Casagrande =

American businessman

- Education: Wardlaw-Hartridge School; Northwestern University Kellogg School of Management (MBA); New York University Stern School of Business (MS); Colgate University (BA)
- Occupation: Businessman

Gregory F. Casagrande is an American businessman and the founder of South Pacific Business Development Microfinance Network, the leading microfinance institution in the Pacific Islands region. He is also the founder of MicroDreams, a microfinance acceleration fund working with emerging microfinance institutions in Latin America, Africa and the Pacific and Transformative Ventures LLC, a Microfinance advisory company.

== Education ==
Casagrande graduated from Wardlaw-Hartridge School in 1981. He received a Master of Business Administration (MBA) in Finance and Marketing from Northwestern University Kellogg School of Management, an MS in Accounting from New York University Stern School of Business as well as a Bachelor of Arts (BA) in Economics with high distinction from Colgate University. Casagrande is also a Certified Public Accountant (CPA).

== Career ==
He recorded significant achievement with Ford, Mazda and Coopers & Lybrand in product development, manufacturing, marketing and financial management positions. He led teams in the United States, Japan and Europe.

Casagrande serves as a director on the boards of the International Association of Microfinance Investors (of New York), Microfinance Pasifika (of Fiji) and Planet Finance (of Paris), and as a fund advisor to Plebys – a for-profit “Base of the Pyramyd” investment fund based in Irvine, California. He also served on the United Nations Board of Patrons for its International Year of Microcredit – 2005. Casagrande is a frequent speaker at conferences and universities around the world on the topics of poverty eradication, building inclusive financial sectors, building sustainable micro-enterprise development organizations, financing Microfinance institutions and social entrepreneurship.

== Business ventures ==
In addition to his micro-finance activities, Casagrande promotes hi-tech entrepreneurship. He is a founding director of the Ice Angels, Australasia's largest angel investor group and serves as Chairman of three New Zealand software firms: Biomatters Ltd, Calcium Solutions Ltd and English-To-Go Ltd.

== Accomplishments and awards ==
Casagrande was awarded the International Year of Microcredit in 2005. In 2010, Casagrande was awarded the Global Social Innovator Award. Greg has been invited as a guest on several occasions for Fijian, Samoan and New Zealand television stations.
