= Mitchell Community College =

Public college in Statesville, North Carolina, US

- Motto: Connecting Life to Learning
- Type: Public community college
- Established: 1917
- Parent institution: North Carolina Community College System
- President: James T. Brewer
- Students: 3,500
- Location: Statesville, North Carolina, United States; 35.783227°N 80.892903°W
- Campus: Small town
- Nickname: Mavericks
- Website: www.mitchellcc.edu

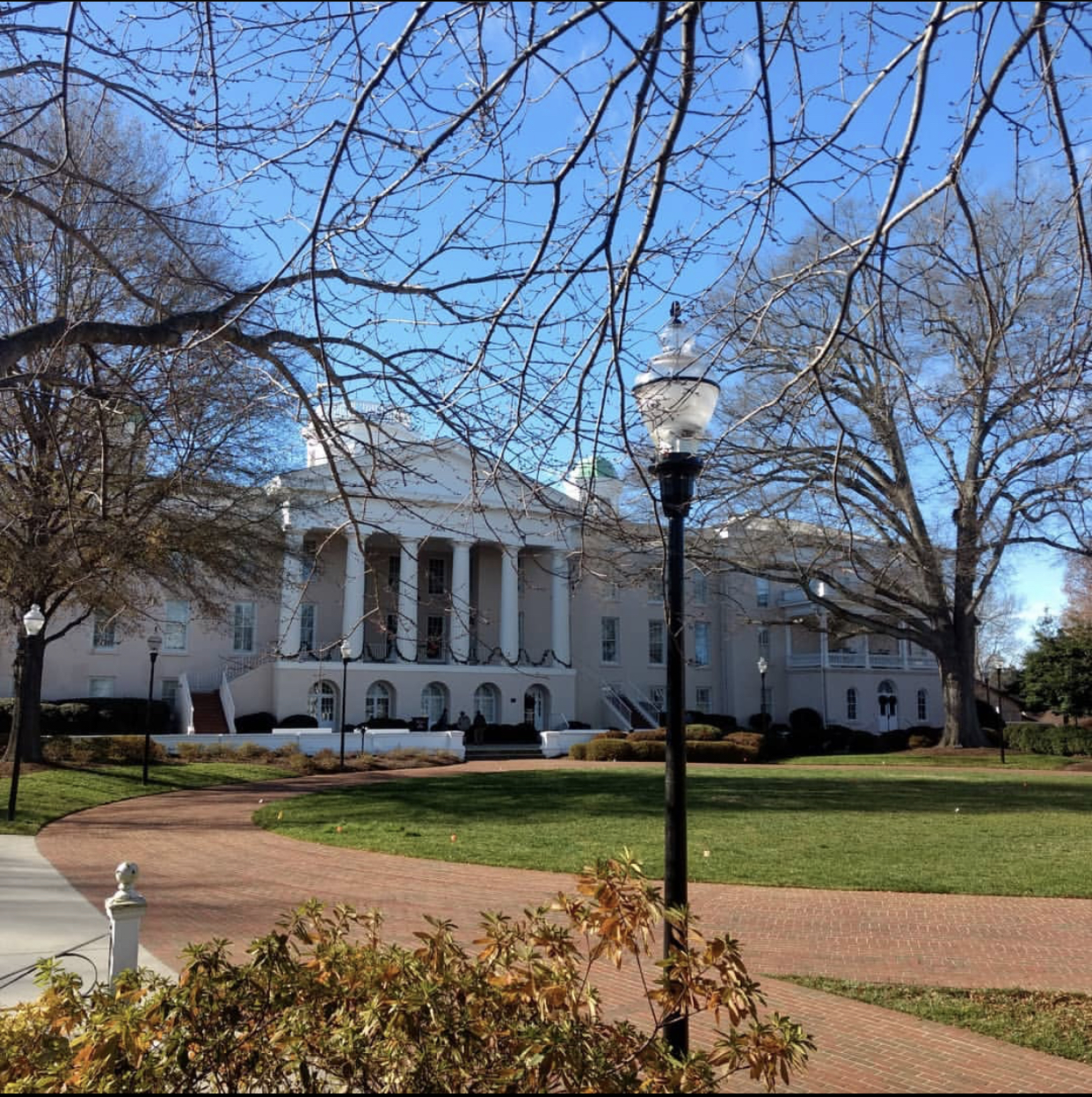
Mitchell Campus

Mitchell Community College is a public community college with its main campus in Statesville, North Carolina and a second campus in Mooresville, North Carolina. It is part of the North Carolina Community College System.

== History ==
The school that would later become Mitchell College opened in 1856 as Concord Female College, a women's college sponsored by the Presbyterian church in North Carolina. After the American Civil War, during a brief period of private ownership, the name of the school was changed to Simonton Female College. In the 1870s, the school grew under the leadership of Eliza Mitchell Grant and Margaret Eliot Mitchell, daughters of the scientist and educator Elisha Mitchell. In 1917, the name of the school was changed to Mitchell College in their honor. In 1932, the school became coeducational, admitting its first male students.

In 1973, Mitchell College joined the North Carolina Community College System and the name was changed to Mitchell Community College.

The Main Building, Mitchell College and Mitchell College Historic District are listed on the National Register of Historic Places.

In the 2008–2009 school year, Mitchell became the first community college in the United States to be accepted into NASA's University Student Launch Initiative competition and placed 8th out of 28 teams. In 2009–2010, Mitchell was again accepted to the competition and the team was able to finish 4th overall.

== Notable alumni ==
- Dale Earnhardt Jr., NASCAR driver who earned his associate degree in automotive technology at Mitchell Community College.
- Virginia Dare Aderholdt, cryptanalyst
