= Ann Baumgartner =

First American woman to fly a jet

- Born: August 27, 1918
- Died: March 20, 2008 (aged 89)
- Military career
- Allegiance: United States
- Branch: United States Army Air Forces
- Unit: Women Airforce Service Pilots

Ann G. Baumgartner Carl (August 27, 1918 – March 20, 2008) was an American aviator who became the first American woman to fly a United States Army Air Forces jet aircraft when she flew the Bell YP-59A jet fighter at Wright Field as a test pilot during World War II. She was assigned to Wright Field as an assistant operations officer in the fighter test section as member of the Women Airforce Service Pilots program.

== Early life ==
Ann G. Baumgartner was born in the United States Army Hospital in Augusta, Georgia, on August 27, 1918. Her father was stationed in France, so her mother moved the family to New Jersey to live with her grandparents. After her father returned to the United States, her family relocated to Plainfield, New Jersey, where she attended Miss Hartridge's School for Girls (now Wardlaw-Hartridge School). Her father was an engineer and patent attorney.

Her inspiration to fly came from a visit by Amelia Earhart to her grade school. She went to Newark Airport with her father to watch the mail planes come in at night.

Baumgartner graduated from Walnut Hill High School in Natick, Massachusetts, and then attended Smith College in Northampton, Massachusetts, where she graduated in 1940 as a pre-med major.

While working in the Eastern Airlines public relations department, Baumgartner learned to fly at Somerset Hills Airport in Basking Ridge, New Jersey.

== Women Airforce Service Pilots program ==
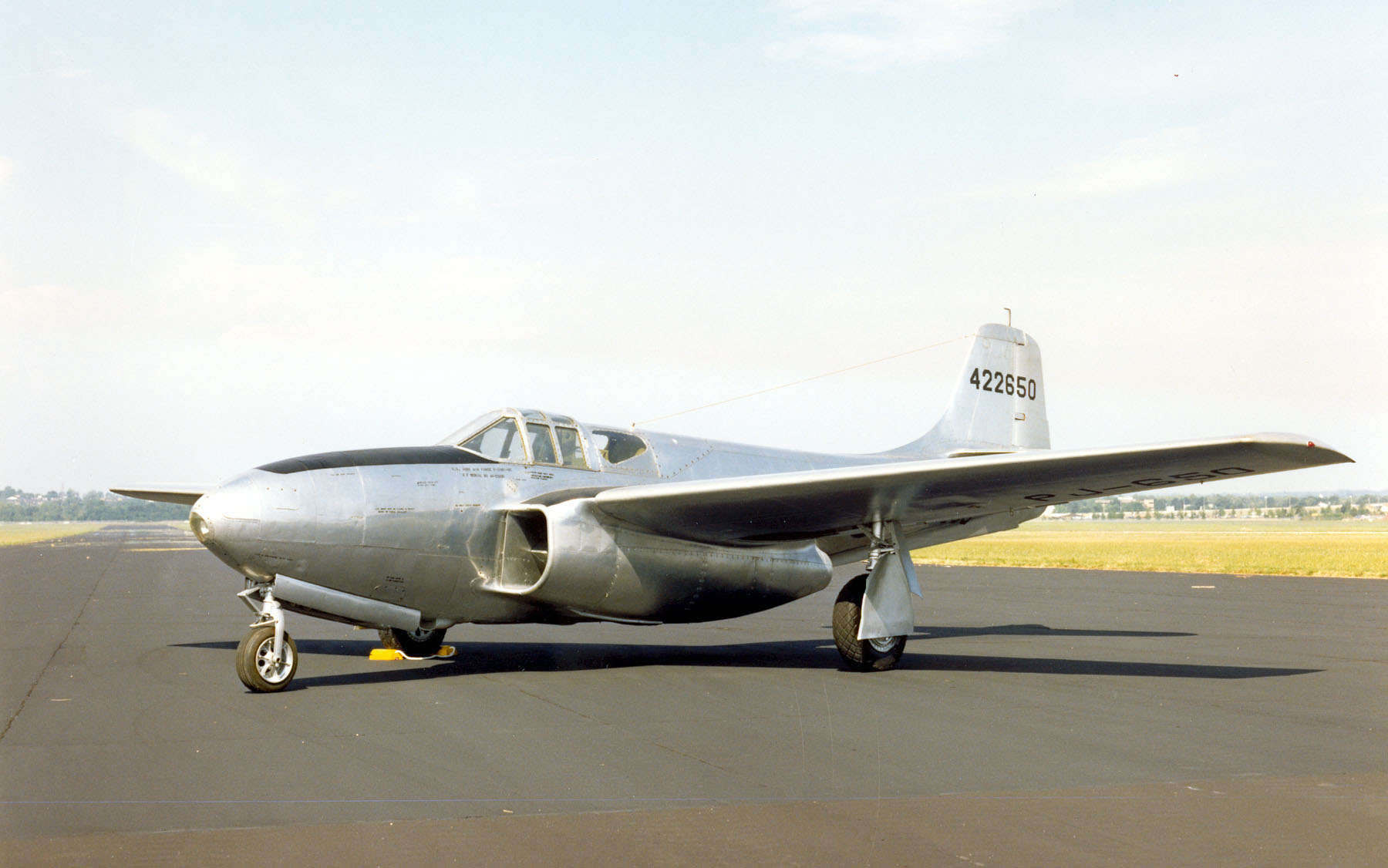
Baumgartner was the first American woman to fly a jet aircraft, the Bell YP-59A.

Originally, Baumgartner reported to Houston, Texas in January 1943 to be in the Women Airforce Service Pilots Class of 43-W-3, but she became ill with the measles and thus graduated on July 3, 1943, with the fifth WASP class (43-W-5). After completing the training, Baumgartner was assigned to Camp Davis in North Carolina as a tow target pilot. Camp Davis was an artillery training base, and the WASPs flew as visual and radar tracking targets. Baumgartner flew the Douglas A-24, Curtiss A-25, Lockheed B-34, Cessna UC-78 and Stinson L-5 while at Camp Davis.

In February 1944, Baumgartner transferred to Wright Field near Dayton, Ohio for a temporary assignment to test aeromedical equipment being designed for the WASP program. While in Ohio, Baumgartner applied for an assignment in the Flight Test Division at Wright Field as an assistant operations officer. In March 1944 she was transferred to Wright Field as an assistant operations officer in the fighter test section.

Originally her duties were primarily clerical, but over time she was permitted to fly as a test pilot. Additionally, Baumgartner was assigned to transport staff officers to other Army bases, and delivered planes as required. When Baumgartner worked in the bomber flight test division for a short time, she gained pilot and copilot experience in the B-17, B-24, B-29, the British de Havilland Mosquito, and the German Junkers Ju 88. After her reassignment back to the fighter test division, she flew America's first jet aircraft, the Bell YP-59A on October 14, 1944, becoming the first American woman to fly a jet. Her assignment as a fighter flight test pilot at Wright Field ended in December 1944 when the WASP program was disbanded.

== Marriage and family life ==
Baumgartner married Major William Carl on May 2, 1945. She met Carl while flight testing the North American P-82 Twin Mustang. Carl continued his career as an engineer and later designed and built hydrofoil boats for the United States Navy and Grumman Aerospace. Together they had two children. With her husband she sailed the Atlantic twice and cruised the Mediterranean, the British Isles, and the French Canals.

== Career ==
While her children were young, she worked in flight instruction and for United Airlines and third pilots at Zahn's Airport on Long Island. Her flight ratings included private, commercial, instrument, multi-engine, flight instruction and instrument. Later she became a journalist who specialized in science.

== Later life and death ==
During the final years of her life, Baumgartner (then Carl) resided in Kilmarnock, Virginia, with her husband. She continued writing, and authored A WASP among Eagles: a woman military test pilot in World War II that discussed her experience as an experimental test pilot in World War II. She also wrote "The Small World of Long Distance Sailors".

Carl died at a nursing home in Kilmarnock on March 20, 2008. She was preceded in death by her husband on February 19, 2008.
