= Helen Nibouar =

American cryptographer

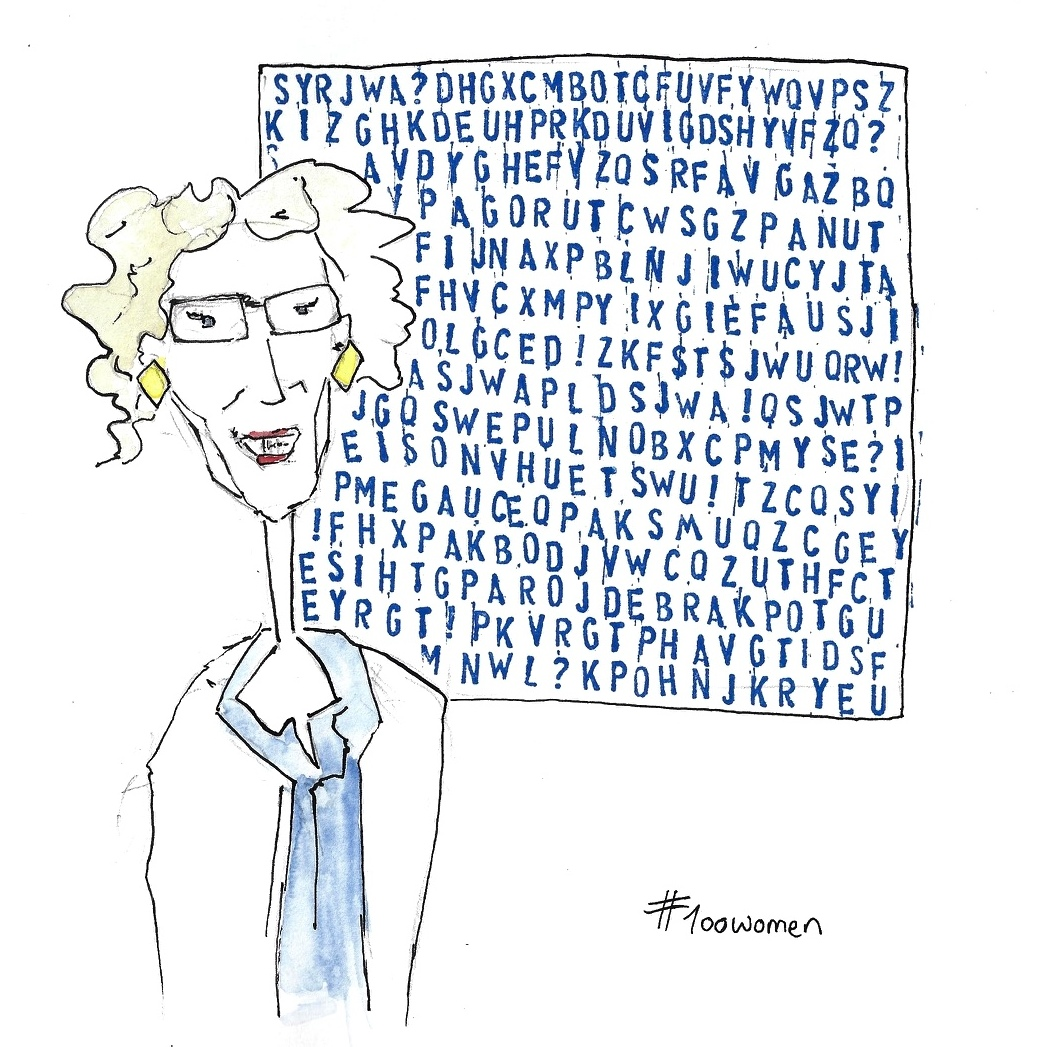
- A watercolour drawing of WWII cryptologist Helen Nibouar created by illustrator Layli Foroudi at the BBC's 100 Women Editathon on 8 December 2016.
- Born: Helen Breese; June 6, 1921; Washington County, Oklahoma, U.S.
- Died: December 28, 2017 (aged 96)
- Known for: Cryptography (specifically in the SIGABA programme)
- Spouse: Lt. Colonel Grover Cleveland Nibouar Jr.
- Honours: Honored by the National Cryptologic Museum for her role in “60 Years of Cryptologic Excellence.”

Helen Lucile Nibouar (née Breese; June 6, 1921 – December 28, 2017) was an American cryptographer who was part of the select group who first worked on the SIGABA cipher device during World War II. She was honored by the National Security Agency's National Cryptologic Museum in 2012 for her role in "60 Years of Cryptologic Excellence".

== Early life ==
Nibouar grew up in Oklahoma, where she attended high school but "was unable to attend any further education." She lived with relatives for a few years before moving to Washington DC. She was inspired to volunteer her services to the US military following the bombing of Pearl Harbor.

== Cryptography ==
Nibouar had not planned to become a cryptographer, but was recruited at the water fountain by a woman who encouraged her to "give cryptography a try." Nibouar then trained at Morrison Field, where she met fellow cryptographer Marion Johnson. The two worked on the SIGABA cipher device, which was used to obscure troop movements and other sensitive material. They were part of a group of about five people who worked decoding these messages in Florida. She later worked in Hawaii, Washington DC, Japan, and The Pentagon. She met her husband, Lieutenant Colonel Grover Cleveland Nibouar Junior, in Japan whilst assigned to the staff of General Douglas MacArthur. She then worked as the instructor, teaching cryptography to military personnel. She was particularly unusual in being able to keep her job after her marriage.

== Later life ==
Nibouar later worked as a teacher and spent a large amount of time volunteering. She and Marion Johnson were recognised at the ribbon-cutting ceremony for the National Cryptologic Museum exhibit on "60 Years of Cryptologic Excellence" in recognition of their work. Nibouar died in December 2017 at the age of 96.

== See also ==
Code Girls
