= Snakk Media =

Snakk Media Limited
- Type: Public
- Traded as: NZX: SNK (Suspended)
- Industry: Mobile advertising
- Founded: New Zealand (2010)
- Defunct: 28 October 2020; 6 years ago
- Headquarters: Auckland, New Zealand
- Area served: Australia, New Zealand, Southeast Asia
- Key people: Joel Williams (CEO), Peter James (Independent Chair), Martin Riegel (Director), Robert Antulov (Director)
- Revenue: $10.25 million (March 2018)
- Number of employees: 25 (March 2018)
- Website: www.snk.co.nz (dead link)

Snakk Media was a mobile advertising company, established in 2010 by Derek Handley, Geoffrey Handley, and Andrew Jacobs. Snakk Media was headquartered in Auckland, New Zealand.

In March 2013, Snakk Media became listed on the New Zealand Alternative Exchange and moved to the NXT index in November 2015.

On 11 December 2018, The New Zealand Herald reported that Snakk Media had entered a voluntary administration with Rahul Goyal and Scott Langdon of KordaMentha, appointed as joint administrators. According to Brian Gaynor, the executive director of Milford Asset Management, the company fell short of expectations and currently has a market value of less than $1 million.

Subsequently, on 21 December 2018, Snakk Media announced on the NXT platform that Mr. Joel Williams, the chief executive officer, had departed from his role within the company.

== History ==
Snakk Media was established in 2010 by Geoff and Derek Handley, along with Andrew Jacobs. It became listed on the New Zealand Exchange in March 2013.

The company expanded its operations with offices in Sydney, Melbourne, Brisbane, Auckland, and Singapore between 2010 and 2013.

In May 2014, Snakk Media made a minority investment in Moasis Global, granting exclusive rights to its patented location-targeting technology in New Zealand and Australia. The company also invested in Plyfe, a cloud-based ad technology platform based in New York.

In September 2014, Snakk Media launched Represent Media, a wholly owned subsidiary selling advertising space for premium publisher titles on mobile apps and websites. ESPN and CBS Interactive were among its early customers.

In November 2014, Snakk Media ranked as the 33rd fastest-growing business in New Zealand on the Deloitte Fast 50 index. It was also ranked as the 186th fastest-growing technology business in the Deloitte Asia Pacific Technology Fast 500. During this time, Snakk Media introduced TV Sync, a product enabling synchronized ads across television, mobile, and tablet screens.

In August 2015, Snakk Media launched Touch Create, a mobile-first creative business providing mobile creative services to brands, media agencies, and creative shops across Australia, New Zealand, and Southeast Asia.

In November 2015, a subsequent Share Offer was issued, raising NZD $2.2 million.

On 2 February 2016, Snakk Media announced a strategic partnership with the US mobile ad tech company UberMedia, exclusively distributing its in-app social, interest, and geo-location mobile advertising products in Australia, New Zealand, and Southeast Asia.

Mark Ryan stepped down as CEO in December 2016, after serving since April 2013. He was succeeded by CEO Joel Williams.

In March 2016, Snakk Media fell victim to a "whale phishing" scheme, resulting in the loss of approximately $215,000 NZD to an unknown fraudster through a fake email.

The company went into voluntary administration in February 2019, followed by liquidation. It was then renamed as Goodwood Capital in October 2020, before renaming again as WasteCo, now trading as a waste management company.

== Funding ==
In May 2013, Snakk Media successfully raised $6.5 million through a share purchase plan.

During August 2015, Snakk Media faced media scrutiny regarding its capitalization and uncertainties about its ability to continue operating as a going concern, as noted in its 2015 annual report by auditors Staples Rodway. In response, the company stated that there was no cause for concern and announced plans to raise additional capital.

Following that, in November 2015, a subsequent share offer was released, resulting in the successful raising of NZD $2.2 million.

== Recognition ==
Snakk Media obtained certification as a "Certified B Corporation" in 2013, meeting the social and environmental performance standards set by the non-profit organization B Lab.

Based on audited year-on-year growth from 1 April 2011, to 31 March 2013, Snakk Media achieved a growth rate of 486.3%, ranking it as New Zealand's 6th fastest-growing business on the Deloitte Fast 50 index.

In December 2013, Snakk Media secured the 62nd position among the fastest-growing technology businesses in the Asia Pacific Technology Fast 500. It was one of only 16 New Zealand companies to rank within the top 100.

In August 2014, Snakk Media was included in the TIN100+ Ten Hot Emerging Companies, which recognizes high-performing companies in the technology export sector as part of the annual TIN 100 Report.

Snakk Media Ltd. was honored with a place on the third annual 'Best for Workers' list in September 2014, acknowledging its worker impact score in the top 10% of all Certified B Corporations.

In November 2014, Snakk Media ranked as New Zealand's 33rd fastest-growing business on the Deloitte Fast 50 index, based on audited year-on-year growth from 1 April 2012, to 31 March 2014, with a growth rate of 254.05%.

Additionally, in November 2014, Snakk Media was ranked as the 186th fastest-growing technology business in the Deloitte Asia Pacific Technology Fast 500.

== See also ==
- List of mobile advertising networks
- Mobile advertising
