= Booktrack =

American audiobook services company

- Operating system: iOS (iPod/iPhone), Android, Windows
- Available in: English
- Website: booktrack.com

Booktrack is an American e-reader platform founded in Auckland, New Zealand.

== History ==
The company was founded in 2011 in Auckland by brothers Mark Cameron and Paul Cameron. Mark Cameron came up with the idea of creating a service that matched soundtracks with books to provide an immersive reading environment. He and his brother spent three years building the technology before launching the site in August 2011. It provides soundtracks with synchronized music, sound effects and ambient sound for written books. The platform uses an algorithm to track users' reading speed and synchronize it with the soundtrack.

The company raised funding from investors including Peter Thiel.

Booktracks are available for download through the Booktrack Bookshelf app in the Apple App Store, Google Play and on a PC using a web browser.

In September 2019, Booktrack introduced Booktrack Studio allowing users to create and publish synchronized soundtracks for books.
