= Genevieve Grotjan Feinstein =

American mathematician and cryptanalyst (1913–2006)

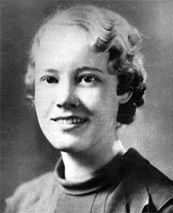
- Born: Genevieve Marie Grotjan; April 30, 1913; Buffalo, New York
- Died: August 10, 2006 (aged 93); Fairfax, Virginia
- Other names: Gene, Gen
- Citizenship: American
- Known for: Deciphering the Purple machine, and key insights into Venona
- Spouse: Hyman Feinstein (m. 1943; died 1995)
- Children: 1
- Scientific career
- Fields: Mathematics; Cryptanalysis
- Workplaces: Signals Intelligence Service

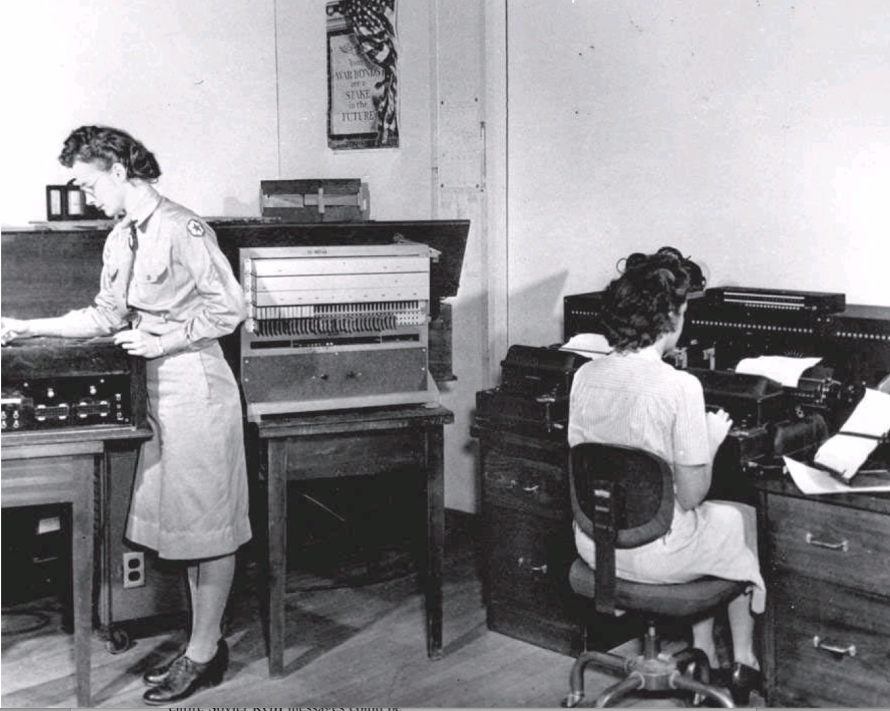
Decoding machine, right, built based on Grotjan's insight, being used to decode Japanese messages in WW II

Genevieve Marie Grotjan Feinstein (April 30, 1913 – August 10, 2006) was an American mathematician and cryptanalyst. She worked for the Signals Intelligence Service throughout World War II, during which time she played an important role in deciphering the Japanese cryptography machine Purple, and later worked on the Cold War-era Venona project.

== Career ==
Feinstein discovered a passion for mathematics at a young age and aspired to become a math teacher. She graduated from the University at Buffalo summa cum laude in February 1936 with a mathematics degree. Unable to find a teaching job, she took a position as a statistical clerk at the Railroad Retirement Board. Her high score on a civil service mathematics test in 1939 got the attention of William F. Friedman, who hired her to work as a junior cryptanalyst for the army's Signals Intelligence Service (SIS). For eighteen months, she worked with other SIS codebreakers to analyze the encryption system used in the Japanese Type B Cipher Machine, code named Purple by the SIS She played a key role in cracking the cipher, discovering cyclical behavior in the code on September 20, 1940. This enabled the construction of an equivalent machine by the SIS which in turn enabled the interception of almost all messages exchanged between the Japanese government and its embassies in foreign countries. Purple-encoded reports from Hiroshi Oshima, the Japanese ambassador in Berlin, were a main source of intelligence about Axis plans.

In 1946, she was awarded the Exceptional Civilian Service Award from Brig. Gen. Paul Everton Peabody for her wartime service.

She was later assigned to the Venona project, trying to decode encrypted messages sent by the Soviet KGB and Main Intelligence Directorate (GRU). She made a significant breakthrough in November 1944, which allowed American cryptographers to recognize when an individual one time pad cipher was (improperly) reused. After the conclusion of World War II, Feinstein continued to work at the SIS, as the Cold War began, but resigned in 1947. After resigning from government cryptanalysis, she joined the faculty of George Mason University, where she briefly served as a professor of mathematics.

== Personal life ==
In 1943, Genevieve Grotjan married the Manhattan Project chemist Hyman Feinstein, who worked at the National Bureau of Standards. They had a son named Ellis, who died of a heart condition at age 22. Widowed in 1995, Genevieve Grotjan Feinstein died in 2006, aged 93.

== Legacy ==
Genevieve Feinstein Award in Cryptography (George Mason University)

Her breakthrough in deciphering the Purple machine has been called, in the Encyclopedia of American Women at War, "one of the greatest achievements in the history of U.S. codebreaking". NSA posthumously inducted her into the NSA Hall of Honor in 2010. In 2018, the university at Buffalo's alumni magazine featured her as "An American Hero".
