= South Pacific Business Development =

South Pacific Business Development (SPBD)
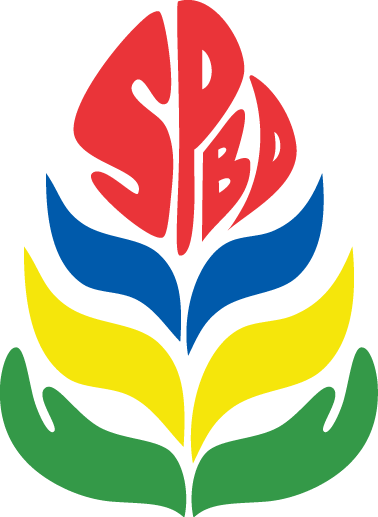
- Type: Non-banking Financial Company
- Industry: Finance
- Founded: 2000; 26 years ago
- Headquarters: Newark, New Jersey, United States
- Area served: Samoa, Tonga, Fiji
- Key people: Gregory Casagrande, founder
- Number of employees: over 50 (2022)
- Website: www.spbdmicrofinance.com

South Pacific Business Development is an organization of microfinance institutions that works in Fiji, Samoa, and Tonga. The focus is to try and eliminate poverty on the Pacific islands.

It aims to provide women in poor rural villages with the opportunity to start, grow, and maintain sustainable income-generating micro-enterprises, build assets through saving as well as finance home improvements and childhood education. SPBD also provides its clients with a range of training, financial services, and ongoing motivation so that they can climb permanently out of poverty.

== History ==
South Pacific Business Development began in the small, rural island of Samoa in 2000. This microfinance organization was created by Gregory F. Casagrande to provide economic opportunities to women in poor communities in Samoa to improve their lifestyle as well as their families. Several years later, in July 2009 SPBD established a replication of SPBD (Samoa) in the Kingdom of Tonga named SPBD Microfinance (Tonga) Ltd.

At the end of 2010, another replication was launched in Fiji, SPBD Microfinance (Fiji) Ltd, meeting the same success as SPBD (Samoa) and SPBD (Tonga). A third replication is in the works and is planned to be launched towards the end of 2012 in the Solomon Islands.

=== Building the network ===
At the end of 2010, South Pacific Business Development created a holding company called South Pacific Business Development Microfinance Holdings limited liability company (Delaware) in the United States of America and placed underneath it another holding company named South Pacific Business Development Microfinance Holdings Pte. Limited in Singapore. The Delaware-based entity serves as the gateway for United States investors to put their money into the SPBD Network, while the Singapore-based company plans to operate as a regional microfinance platform in the Pacific.

The South Pacific Business Development Microfinance Holdings Pte. Limited in Singapore owns SPBD Samoa, SPBD Tonga, and SPBD Fiji and is responsible for launching other greenfield microfinance operations in other Pacific Island countries such as in the Solomon Islands at the end of 2012. All of SPBD's microfinance institutions are registered as non-bank financial institutions (NBFIs), with SPBD Samoa recently having transformed from a non-governmental organization (NGO) status.

== Statistics ==
Since distributing its first micro-enterprise loan in January 2000, SPBD has provided over 31,000 loans (approx. US$15,000,000) to create opportunities for about 14,000 Samoan families in 415 villages to build small businesses.
