= Anna Edinger =

German activist and women's rights campaigner

- Born: Anna Goldschmidt; 17 May 1863; Free City of Frankfurt
- Died: 21 December 1921 (aged 58); Oberursel, Hesse, Germany
- Occupations: Social activist Women's rights activist Women's education activist Peace activist Local politician Research benefactress
- Spouse: Ludwig Edinger
- Children: 1. Fritz (1888–1942), who became an eminent neurologist / psychiatrist 2. Dora (1894–1982), who later married the pharmacologist Werner Lipschitz; 3. Tilly Edinger (1897–1967), who became a pioneering paleoneurologost

Anna Edinger (nee Goldschmidt; 17 May 1863 – 21 December 1929) was a German social activist, women's rights campaigner and peace activist. She received a large inheritance in 1906 and became, in addition to her own campaigning, significant as a benefactress to the Neurology Institute set up by her husband, and a few years later integrated into the newly established University of Frankfurt.

== Life ==
=== Provenance and early years ===
Anna Goldschmidt was born at Frankfurt am Main, at that time a free city within the German Confederation. However, she was still only 7 when the city lost its independence, becoming instead part of what came to be known in English language sources as the German empire. Moritz Benedict Goldschmidt (1831-1906), her father, was co-owner of a successful banking business and a notable art collector: Anna and her siblings underwent a childhood conditioned by her father's significant wealth. Her mother, born Pauline Jacobsen (1836-1901), came from a Jewish mercantile family with close family links to Hamburg. It was as a member of the city's Jewish haute bourgeoisie that Anna grew up in a large lively family home in which guests were always welcomed. As a result of her parents' sociability, Anna Goldschmidt came into frequent contact with artists and art collectors, without ever needing to leave the house. Regular visitors also included academics, journalist and social philanthropists. Two of these were the pioneering gynecologist Elisabeth Winterhalter (whose patient she later became) and Winterhalter's partner, the artist Ottilie Roederstein, both of whom became personal friends and allies in respect of shared objectives that included securing, for women, access to university-level education and the improvement of social living conditions.

=== Ludwig Edinger ===
She also acquired a particular interest in what sources of the time term the "natural sciences", and might have wished to study science at a university level, but the opportunities to do so in Germany did not exist. Other countries, notably Switzerland (where her friend Elisabeth Winterhalter had studied medicine), were a little bit less restrictive when it came to higher education for women, but even to contemplate studying abroad would have risked a breach with her parents. Anna had a powerful sense of duty, meaning that such a breach would have been unthinkable for her. Slightly unusually, she was instead able to find a rewarding outlet for her fascination with, and growing knowledge of, the "natural sciences" through marriage. In 1886 Anna Goldschmidt married the young anatomist-neurologist Ludwig Edinger, a scientist of talent, energy and influence, who would develop an international reputation in connection with a number of specialisms. The marriage took place in Frankfurt am Main and was followed, in due course, by the births of the couple's three children between 1888 and 1897. Anna Edinger was a compulsive autodidact, and was on occasion able to apply knowledge she had acquired through her own studies to support her husband's research, who found her hunger fir knowledge "a source of singular joy" ("ausgesprochen genussfreudig"). She got to know her husband's colleagues, participated with him in academic congresses and encountered his patients, some of whom she attended at their homes. She was then able creatively to adapt and where appropriate implement medical and socio-political ideas acquired through her close involvement in her husband's career in some of her own activities, also opening up areas of public work and engagement for other woman. As they continued to build their lives together, during the early twentieth century the wealth that Anna brought to the marriage would enable her husband (the early part of whose university career had been hampered, according to at least one source, by a resurgence in antisemitism during the 1890s) to "set up a private research institute from his own resources" and later, in 1914. to become one of the founders of the Goethe University of Frankfurt, at which he then accepted the first ordinary (i.e. full) university professorship in neurology to be established at any university in Germany. After Ludwig Edinger's sudden and relatively early death, his widow would respond by increasing the capital of the "Ludwig Edinger [neurological research] Foundation" by an additional 250,000 Marks (equivalent to roughly €1,000,000 a century later).

=== Women's rights and social welfare work ===
Sources make little mention of Anna Edinger's role as a mother, which in wealthy families would generally be delegated to senior household servants, to the extent practicable. Following the birth of her eldest child in 1888, the combination of marriage and motherhood seem rapidly to have opened the way for an increasingly public career focused on social welfare and women's rights, which soon extended well beyond the traditional socio-political engagement in social welfare in underprivileged Jewish communities. A particular preoccupation was with women's access to higher education. Already a member of the "Israelitische Frauenverein" ("Israelite women's association"), in 1888 she joined the "Frankfurter Frauenbildungs-Verein" ("... women's education association"). In 1892 she teamed up with Hella Flesch to set up the Frankfurt "Hauspflegeverein" ("Home care association"), in order to provide help for low income families in need and, in particular, to finance home nursing for housewives confined to their homes by childbirth or illness.

In 1895 she co-founded a Frankfurt local group of the Allgemeiner Deutscher Frauenverein ("... women's association" / ADF which had originated in Leipzig earlier that same year. As a member of the executive committee of the Frankfurt group she immediately stood out, along with the tobacco heiress Marie Pfungst, on account of her ambitions for the association. Edinger, Pfungst and their fellow executive committee member, Edinger's cousin Bertha Pappenheim, all took part at the ADF national assembly held at Eisenach in 1901. She was particularly preoccupied with the ravages of Tuberculosis, among the most frequent causes of child mortality during the 1890s. It was also in 1895 that Erdinger published a ground-breaking article in the monthly women's news magazine "Die Frau" ("The Woman") on the subject of home-care for the poor ("Hausarmenpflege"). This turned out to be the launch of a significant project which created a precedent for other towns and cities across Germany. Carefully trained carers saw to it that impoverished families were cared for if the woman of the house fell ill. In this way Edinger created and implemented a dual emancipatory strategy which supported both the providers and the recipients of the emergency home care. Longstanding assumptions of "natural distinctions" between gender roles also sometimes came to be reassessed. Aspects of "maternal care" and related now were to be re-evaluated in terms of "domestic responsibilities" in response to rapidly progressing industrialisation and urbanisation that were a feature of the time. There was a sense in which unpaid women's work and rarely or minimally paid women's work could become a professionalised branch of labour. Other locally based welfare organisation in which Edinger took a leading or coordinating role during the 1890s included the "Stadtbund der Vereine für Armenpflege und Wohltätigkeit" dedicated to caring for the poor and charitable activity in the Frankfurt area and Wilhelm Merton's Institut für Gemeinwohl ("Institute for the common good"), of which she was a founder member. During this period Edinger was among the first to introduce a more professional and structured approach to the various privately set up and operated charitable organisations emerging at the time. In 1900 she was among the co-founders of the Licht- und Luftbad Niederrad (loosely, "Light and air bath"), a stretch of green parkland alongside the south bank of the River Main set up as a prophylaxis against tuberculosis, initially, at her own expense in Frankfurt-Sachsenhausen.

By the end of the century, drawing inspiration from American and English welfare organisations, Edinger's welfare work was increasingly a question of organising, co-ordination and networking. A decade earlier she had been concerned with social welfare in Frankfurt but now, reacting to the way in which the same pressures and issues arose across the country, her own approach became more and more supra-regional and, on occasion, international. An aspect of this, between 1903 and 1910, was her participation as a member of the national executive committee of the Bund Deutscher Frauenvereine (BdF / "Federation of German Women's Associations"). In 1904 she took a leading role in an international women's congress held that year in Berlin under the aegis of the newly created "International Women's Suffrage Alliance" (renamed in the 1920s as the "International Alliance of Women"). She herself chaired the "social institutions" section of the congress. Both through the sheer power of her charitable commitment and on account of her personal knowledge of the desperate social plight of many women, she continued to focus her attention on the fight against female poverty.

=== City politics ===
In 1907 Edinger was appointed to membership of the Frankfurt "Armen- und Waisenrat" ("Council for the impoverished and orphans"). In view of her experience, commitment and public profile it might be considered an unremarkable appointment; except that at the time she was the first woman to be appointed to such a position with full voting rights anywhere in the "Kingdom of Prussia" (the largest component state within the "German empire", and the one into which the formerly "Free City of Frankfurt" had, for administrative purposes, been forcibly subsumed in 1866).

=== Neurological institute ===
By 1897 Ludwig and Anna Erdinger had produced three children. In addition to attending to her public social welfare and family responsibilities, Anna Erdinger continued to support her husband in his work to the full extent possible. Since 1903 Ludwig Erdinger had headed up a special department for brain research at the Senkenberg Anatomical Institute. Through the financial generosity of his wife, whose wealthy father died in 1906, he was now able to extend it to the point at which it became a self-supporting Neurological Institute which, following the establishment of 1914 the Goethe University of Frankfurt, was integrated into what quickly grew to become one of Germany's leading universities.

=== Peace ===
Balancing family duties with support for her husband's research work and her co-ordination and management activities involving local welfare charities, along with the BdF, was presumably a challenge. Nevertheless, during the first decade of the twentieth century she was also emerging as a forceful peace activist, initially locally and then both nationally and internationally, as part of the International Peace Movement which grew up in parallel with the intensifying arms race. As early as 1893 Erdinger was a member of the "Frankfurter Friedensverein" ("Frankfurt Peace Association"), founded in 1886. She participated actively in several of the association's conferences. She used her networks to promote the twin causes of peace and freedom. In an age of increasingly untrammeled jingoism, her uncompromising commitment pacifism (in combination, frequently, with her feminism) attracted hostility from many backers and members of the more mainstream women's organisations.

Some time around 1900, shortly after the first Hague Peace Conference, the German Women's Peace Movement came together. It consisted primarily of women drawn from the more radical extremes of middle-class feminism, such as Anna Erdinger. After the outbreak of the First World War would accordingly reject and boycott calls by the BdF to join a "national front" in support of military mobilisation. Edinger, having already participated in 1908 and again in 1911 as a BdF delegate to the Peace Committee of the International Congress of Women, as well as at congresses in Geneva and Stockholm, was bitterly dismayed in August 1914 when Germany's military mobilisation was backed by both the SPD and the BdF.

As the horrors of war polarised opinions, Anna Edinger was characteristically clear-sighted over what divided those within the BdF who campaigned for an end to the war, from the majority, still in 1915 keen to pursue the conflict, at any price, to the end:

"Aside from the war fundamentalists, there are two opposing camps: [1] that respect for Germany and national security on the home front can only be achieved by fighting for the complete crushing of the enemy: and [2] that the longer the fighting goes on, the more serious will be the wounds inflicted, meaning it will become ever more difficult to arrive at a peace settlement that provides no fuel for new wars, [based on the continuing fallacy that] respect for Germany can only be won and secured through the sword,"
"Es stehen sich, abgesehen von der grundsätzlichen Auffassung des Krieges, zwei Anschauungen gegenüber: die, dass Achtung vor Deutschland und innere Sicherheit nur durch ein gründliches Niederwerfen der Gegner zu erkämpfen ist; und die, dass je länger gekämpft wird, je schwerere Wunden geschlagen werden, desto schwerer es sein wird, zu einem Frieden zu kommen, der keinen Zündstoff für neue Kriege hinterlässt – dass Achtung vor Deutschland nicht durch das Schwert gewonnen oder befestigt werden kann."

Anna Edinger, reacting to attempts by other BdF members to exclude her from it on account of her opposition to the war.

Under the leadership of the physician and pioneering women's rights activist, Aletta Jacobs, a team of politically engaged women set about organising an international conference at the Hague, to be conducted under the auspices of the movement then known as the World League for Women's Voting Rights ("Weltbundes für Frauenstimmrecht" / IAW). Despite the travel difficulties presented by a war in which most of the countries from which the delegates came (though not, in military terms, the Netherlands) were engaged, this Hague Conference was duly held between 26 April 1915 and 1 May 1915. According to the programme printed at the time, the largest national delegation by far came from "Great-Britain and Ireland", with 107 delegates listed. The British also sent two men, identified as "visitors". The second largest delegation came from Germany, with 43 applicants to attend, and 31 participants still listed in the programme when it was printed. 28 of these actually attended. Edinger was one of them. The shared objectives of the conference delegates were to provide a forum for energetic protest against the war and to establish a set of binding principles for a new and better world order.

The stresses of war had led to political polarisation in Germany as elsewhere, and the BdF refused to have anything to do with the Hague Conference, arguing that participation would run counter to national duty. Her opposition to militarism seems to have been behind the BdF "internal politics" which as early as 1910 had cost Edinger her membership of the organisation's national executive committee. Now the leadership decided that becoming involved in the Hague Conference was "unpatriotic" and thereby incompatible with BdF membership. What followed was a stark - and in terms of shared objectives potentially damaging - split in the German women's movement, between the "middle-class" and "socialist" wings. The Social Democrat ladies suddenly rediscovered their "patriotism" and, in a development which both echoed and contrasted with the split within the SPD itself, it was now the BdF's "middle-class peaceniks", such as Edinger, who were pushed into positions of opposition. By participating in the 1915 Hague Peace Conference Edinger was seen to have "boycotted" the call of the BdF. Edinger was also able to support the event with a large financial donation. When it was over she offered her report of the conference to Helene Lange, in Lange's capacity as president of the "Allgemeiner Deutscher Frauenverein" / ADF in order that it might be published in the ADF's newly launched feminist periodical "Neue Bahnen. Blätter für soziale Arbeit". Lange refused to print it, however, on the grounds that participation at the congress indicated a "not patriotic" attitude. This rigidly exclusionist approach was greeted by Edinger with incomprehension and exasperation: she was unable to comprehend hos it could be construed as "not patriotic" to participate in a conference that opposed a war that "nobody wanted".

=== Later years ===
After the war ended Anne Edinger continued her antiwar engagement, working with what became the Women's International League for Peace and Freedom. She also continued to serve as president of the "Verband Frankfurter Frauenvereine" (loosely, "Confederation of Women's Associations").

Ludwig Edinger died suddenly following a heart attack early in 1918. She continued to support her late husband's work, notably with at least one massive financial donation to the Ludwig-Edinger Foundation, which by that time had been integrated into the University of Frankfurt, of which she continues to be listed as a major benefactress.

By the time Anna Edinger herself died, at the end of 1929, she had been honoured with the "Plaque of Honour of the city of Frankfurt" and a small street in Frankfurt-Dornsbusch had been renamed "Edingerweg" in honour of the couple. Only Ludwig Edinger enjoyed the additional distinction of giving his name to a small body part, however.
