= Christina Klausmann =

German historian, publicist (1957 - 2008)

Christina Klausmann (7 December 1957 – 21 October 2008) was a German historian, publicist and curator specializing in gender relations and women's movement culture in Germany.

== Life and work ==
Klausmann was born on 7 December 1957 in Freiburg im Breisgau. She studied history and German studies at Albert-Ludwigs-Universität Freiburg. The central theme of her academic work was historical women's studies. Klausmann was awarded her doctorate in 1995 with the dissertation Politik und Kultur der Frauenbewegung im Kaiserreich. The example of Frankfurt am Main by Dieter Langewiesche at the University of Tübingen. Klausmann's social-historical local study was produced as part of the German Research Foundation (DFG) funded project Sittlichkeit und Stimmrecht - Zur Politik und Kultur der Frauenbewegung um die Jahrhundertwende under the direction of Ute Gerhard at the Department of Sociology at Johann Wolfgang Goethe University Frankfurt am Main and in collaboration with Ulla Wischermann.

Klausmann's work provides with the collective biographical Historical Network Research approach, Klausmann's work provides a differentiated picture of the personal connections in the Frankfurt women's movement around 1900. She dealt with active Frankfurt associations and organizations such as the local group of the Allgemeiner Deutscher Frauenverein (ADF).

Klausmann also followed the development of the program of the local branch of the "Verein Frauenbildung-Frauenstudium" Women's Education and Women's Studies Association founded in 1898 around Elisabeth Winterhalter, the first female gynaecologist in Frankfurt, until around the beginning of First World War. In an "approach to a collective biography", the study also shows individual leading players, including the cousins Anna Edinger (1863–1929) and Bertha Pappenheim (1859–1936), in their mediating functions between the local, national and international women's movement. Klausmann also relates the forms of organization and representation of the first women's movement as well as their strategies for mobilizing supporters to the particularities of the historical urban public: a relatively large proportion of the activists came from the liberal Jewish middle classes with close organizational and personal ties to the social reform circles. This urban elite, to which the social politician and publicist Henriette Fürth (1861–1938), supported the establishment of independent institutional social welfare for women in need (including a legal protection office for women, facilities for girls and unmarried mothers), especially for working women and their families. Klausmann also emphasized the principle of self-organization independent of male influence as fundamental to the new women's movement.

From 1991 to 2004, Christina Klausmann was co-publisher and editor of Feministische Studien, after which she was a member of the periodical's scientific advisory board.

Due to her dissertation and other research and publications, for example on the Darmstadt women's rights activist, publicist and philosopher Louise Dittmar (1807–1884), Klausmann was considered an expert on the history of the German women's movement.

Klausmann died in Stuttgart on 21 October 2008 at the age of 50.

== Curatorial work ==
As a research assistant, she was involved in the conception and editing of museum exhibitions, such as the exhibitions "Sklavin oder Bürgerin? French Revolution and New Femininity 1760-1830" at the Historisches Museum Frankfurt am Main in 1989 and "1848 - Awakening to Freedom" at the Schirn Kunsthalle Frankfurt in 1998. Klausmann then worked as a research assistant at the Haus der Geschichte Baden-Württemberg in Stuttgart and was responsible, among other things, for the permanent exhibition "Landesgeschichte(n). The German Southwest from 1790 to the present day".
