= Klausmann =

Surname

Klausmann is a surname. It may refer to:

- Christina Klausmann (1957–2008), German historian, publicist and curator specializing in gender relations and women's movement
- Marcus Klausmann (born 1977), German former downhill mountain biker
