= Ralph Holloway =

American anthropologist (1935–2025)

Ralph Leslie Holloway Jr. (February 6, 1935 – March 12, 2025) was an American physical anthropologist at Columbia University and research associate with the American Museum of Natural History. Since obtaining his Ph.D. from the University of California, Berkeley in 1964, Holloway served as a professor of anthropology at Columbia. Holloway's interests were in craniology, producing endocasts, primate behavior, biology of gender, sexual dimorphism in the corpus callosum, and other topics. He developed the subdiscipline of hominin paleoneurology.

== Life and career ==
Holloway was born in Philadelphia, Pennsylvania. His work on the Taung Child was one of the first to suggest brain reorganization occurring before the increase of brain size in hominids. His claim that the lunate sulcus, a sulcus which marks the boundary of the occipital lobe, was in a posterior position to that of apes suggests that the reduction of the occipital lobe was accompanied by enlargements of parts of the brain associated with higher cognitive function. Holloway died in New York City on March 12, 2025, at the age of 90.

== See also ==
- The Mismeasure of Man § Craniometry

== Related readings ==
- Holloway, Ralph L. (2008). "The Human Brain Evolving: A Personal Retrospective". Annual Review of Anthropology. 37 (1). Annual Reviews: 1–19. doi:10.1146/annurev.anthro.37.081407.085211.
