= Louise Dittmar =

German feminist

Johanna Friederieke Louise Dittmar (September 7, 1807 – July 11, 1884) was a German feminist and revolutionary philosopher. She was the author of nine books, and the founding editor of the journal Soziale Reform. Along with more general advocacy of equality for women, social justice, and a radical and near-atheist approach to religion, her works "in a manner unique for her time repeatedly and brilliantly questioned the notion of 'natural' differences between the sexes". She has been called "Germany's most brilliant (and yet often misunderstood) feminist theorist of the 1840s".

Louise-Dittmar Straße, a road in Darmstadt-Eberstadt, was named for her in 2002.

== Life ==
Dittmar was born on September 7, 1807, in Darmstadt. She was one of ten children of a treasury official for the Grand Duchy of Hesse, had no formal education, and was the only daughter to remain unmarried, in part because her father's salary could not extend to a dowry for her. One of her brothers was involved in the leftist Büchner affair of the 1830s, and she and three other brothers also became liberals, while the rest of the family remained loyal to the duke.

She began publishing her books anonymously in 1845, but after publishing four of them she revealed her identity in a public lecture in Mannheim in 1847. Her friends and correspondents in this period included Ludwig Bamberger, Karl Theodor Bayrhoffer, and Ludwig Feuerbach. With Feuerbach's encouragement, she founded the journal Soziale Reform in 1849. After losing her anonymity, she published an additional five books, including an omnibus edition of her four earlier books, two books of poetry, and one of collected essays from the journal.

After the failure of the German revolutions of 1848–1849 and consequent suppression of liberal views, she left public life. Her brothers emigrated as Forty-Eighters, and her journal shut down after only four issues. She began living alone in 1850. She moved in with two younger relatives in 1880, and died on July 11, 1884, in Bessungen, largely forgotten. Her works were not revived until the 1970s and 1980s.

== Books ==
Dittmar's books include:

- Bekannte Geheimnisse (1845)
- Skizzen und Briefe (1845)
- Der Mensch und sein Gott (1846)
- Lessing und Feuerbach (1847)
- Vier Zeitfragen (1847)
- Zur Charakterisierung der nordischen Mythologie (1848)
- Wühlerische Gedichte (1848)
- Brutus-Michel (1848)
- Das Wesen der Ehe nebst einigen Aufsätzen über die soziale Reform der Frauen (edited, 1849; abridged edition Das Wesen der Ehe published in 1850)
