= Elisabeth Winterhalter =

German surgeon (1856–1952)

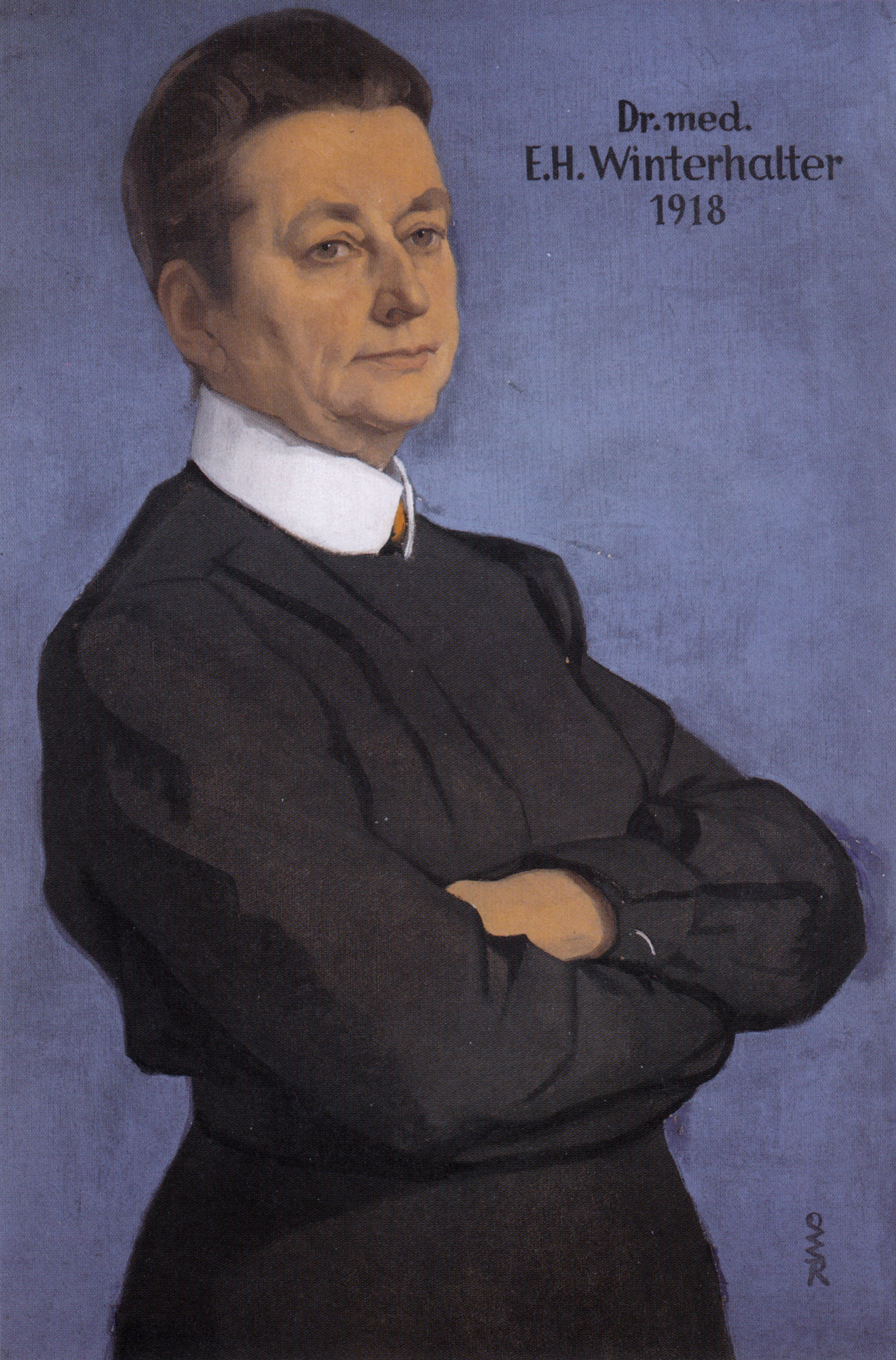
Elisabeth Winterhalter; portrait by Ottilie Roederstein (1918)

Elisabeth Hermine Winterhalter (17 December 1856, Munich – 13 February 1952, Hofheim am Taunus) was a German gynecologist, surgeon, feminist and patron of the arts. She was one of the first female doctors and the first female surgeon in Germany. Painter Ottilie Roederstein was her long-time companion.

== Biography ==
She was the thirteenth and last child of Georg and Elisabeth Winterhalter, née Von Garr. Her father died when she was only eleven years old. He was a doctor, as were her grandfather, great-grandfather and oldest brother and, from an early age, she expressed a desire to be a doctor too. This goal was not supported by her family. Instead, after some time at a boarding school in Beuerberg Abbey, she was sent to a teacher training school and took a position as an assistant teacher in Schwabing.

In 1884, her mother relented and agreed to support her medical studies. At that time, women were not allowed to attend universities in the German Empire, so she applied at the University of Zürich and the University of Bern. She passed the Swiss Matura in 1885 and was admitted in Zürich. Later that summer, through her acquaintances at the university, she met Ottilie Roederstein, a portrait painter who lived in Paris and spent her summers in Zürich with her family. By 1887, they had become lovers.

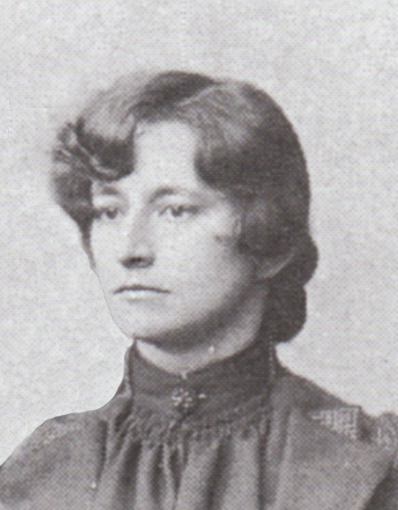
Winterhalter in 1886

She passed her Physikum (intermediate examination) in 1886 and her Staatsexamen in 1889. This was followed by internships at surgical clinics in Paris and Munich. She learned gynecological massage in Stockholm, from the physiotherapist, Thure Brandt. In 1890, she received her Doctorate and practiced in Zürich.

=== Medical career ===
The following year, she and Roederstein moved to Frankfurt am Main, where career opportunities had opened up for Roederstein. There, Winterhalter also had an opportunity to set up the first gynecological polyclinic at the DRK-Schwesternschaft (a Red Cross organization). Although she was unable to obtain a German medical license, she established a reputation as a gynecologist and obstetrician and, in 1895, became the first female surgeon in Germany to perform a laparotomy. Together with Dr. Ludwig Edinger, under the aegis of Prof. Carl Weigert, she conducted research that led to the discovery of the ganglion cell of the ovary, and published a major paper on the subject in 1896.

In 1902, women in Germany obtained the right to study medicine. Therefore, at the age of forty-seven, she took the Physikum and the Staatsexamen and, in 1903, was issued a license to practice medicine in Germany.

In 1907, she and Roederstein bought some land near Hofheim am Taunus. By 1909, they had built a villa there. Winterhalter continued to practice medicine until 1911, when she had to resign for health reasons. From then on she devoted herself to supporting her partner's career, household finances, and gardening. She also co-founded a municipal library and became involved in several charitable causes. For these activities, she and Roederstein were granted honorary citizenship in Hofheim.

During the rise of the Nazis, they were left largely unmolested, but became increasingly withdrawn, socially. Roederstein died in 1937, and Winterhalter created a joint legacy, the Roederstein-Winterhalter-Stiftung.

On her 95th birthday, she was honored by President Theodor Heuss for her pioneering work in opening up the medical profession to women. She died two months later and was placed together with Roederstein in an "Ehrengrab". A street in the Niederursel district of Frankfurt is named after her.

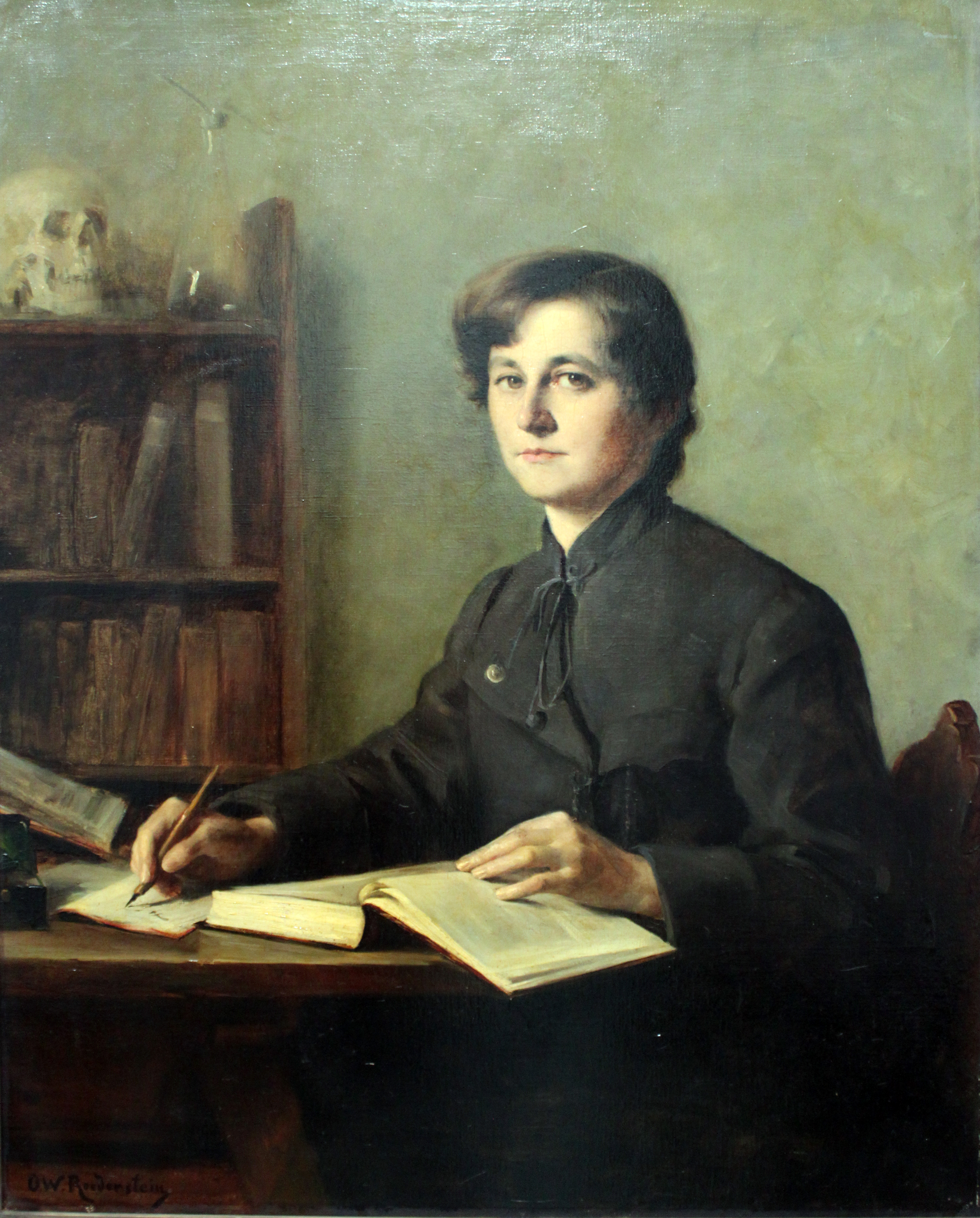
An early portrait of Winterhalter by Roederstein (1887)
