= Paleoneurobiology =

Study of brain evolution using brain endocasts

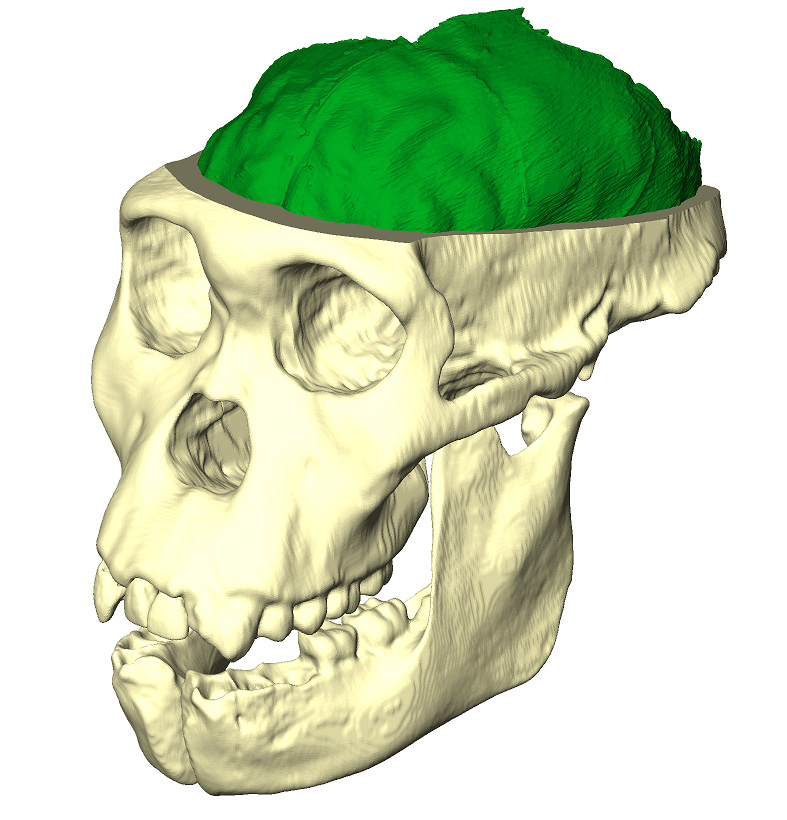
Endocast of Australopithecus sediba

Paleoneurobiology is the study of brain evolution by analysis of brain endocasts to determine endocranial traits and volumes. Considered a subdivision of neuroscience, paleoneurobiology combines techniques from other fields of study including paleontology and archaeology. It reveals specific insight concerning human evolution. The cranium is unique in that it grows in response to the growth of brain tissue rather than genetic guidance, as is the case with bones that support movement. Fossil skulls and their endocasts can be compared to each other, to the skulls and fossils of recently deceased individuals, and even compared to those of other species to make inferences about functional anatomy, physiology and phylogeny. Paleoneurobiology is in large part influenced by developments in neuroscience as a whole; without substantial knowledge about current functionality, it would be impossible to make inferences about the functionality of ancient brains.

Hominid paleoneurobiology refers specifically to the study of brain evolution by directly examining the fossil record of humans and their closest hominid relatives (defined as species more closely related to humans than chimpanzees). Paleoneurobiologists analyze endocasts that reproduce details of the external morphology of brains that have been imprinted on the internal surfaces of skulls.

== History ==
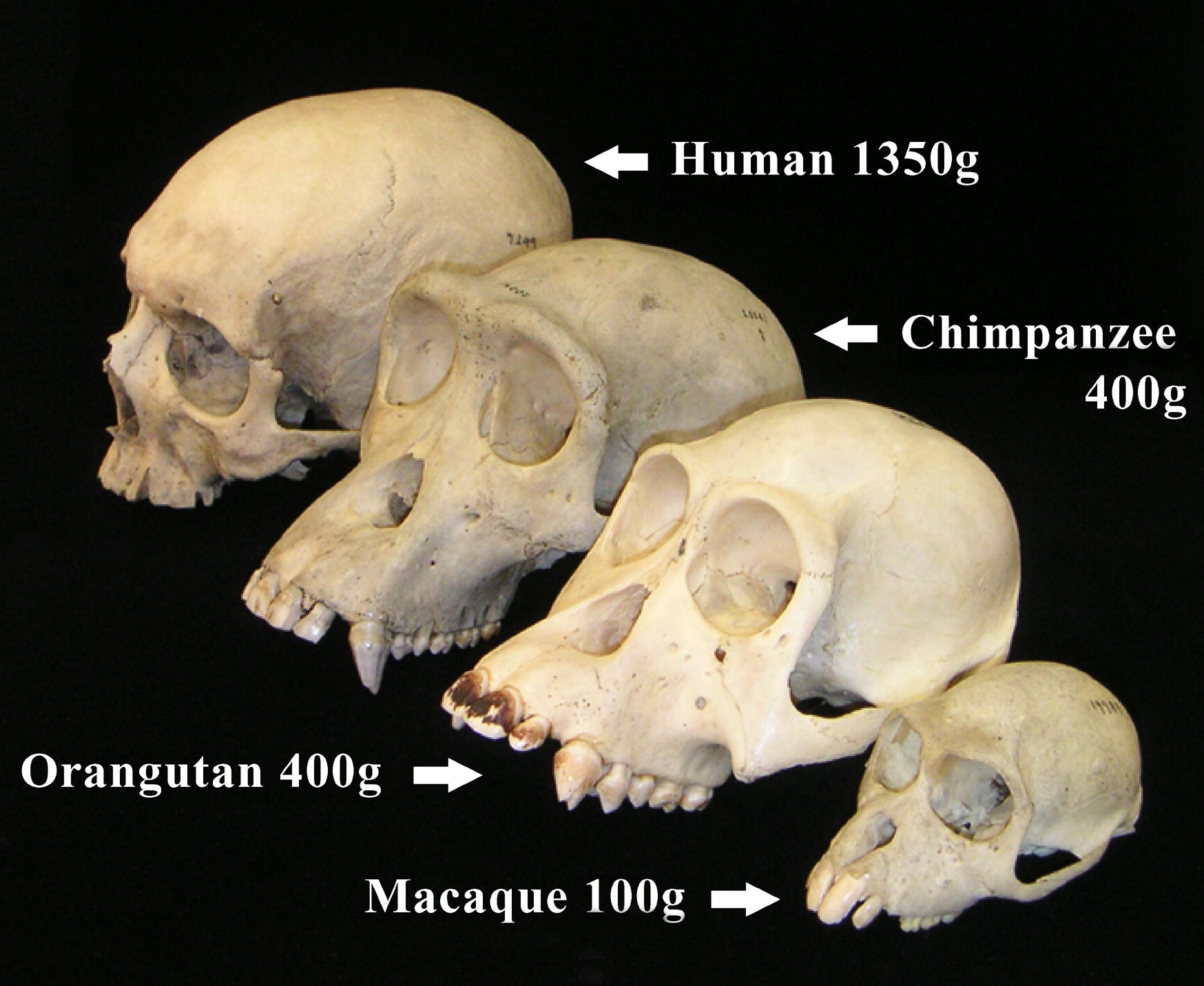
Primate skull series

Humans have had a long interest in the brain and its functions. The first recorded study of the brain and its functions was from a papyrus text written by the ancient Egyptians during the 17th century BCE. The document details 48 medical ailments and makes references to how to deal with head wounds. Much later in the 6th century BCE the ancient Greeks began to focus on studies of the brain and the relationship between the optic nerve and the brain. Studies of brain evolution, however, did not come about until much later in human history.

Comparative anatomy began its emergence in the latter part of the 19th century. Two main views of life sprung forth; rationalism and transcendentalism. These formed the basis for the thought of scientists in this period. Georges Cuvier and Étienne Geoffroy St. Hilaire were leaders in the new field of comparative anatomy. Cuvier believed in the ability to create a functional morphology based simply on empirical evidence. He stressed function of the organ must coincide with its form. Geoffroy, in contrast, put a heavy emphasis on intuition as a method of understanding. His thought was based on two principles: the principle of connections and the principle of unity of plan. Geoffroy was one of the first to look for homologies in organs across species, though he believed that this was evidence of a universal plan rather than descent with modification.

The late part of the 19th century in comparative anatomy was heavily influenced by the work of Charles Darwin in the On the Origin of Species in 1859. This work completely changed the views of comparative anatomists. Within eight years of Darwin's release of the Origin of Species, his views on descent from a common ancestor were widely accepted. This led to a shift in trying to understand how different parts of the brain evolved. The next major innovation that helped to bring about paleoneurobiology was the microscope. Although the microscope was invented in the 17th century, it was only used in biology in the beginning in the late 19th century. The techniques of observing brain cells under a microscope took a long time to refine. In 1873, with this tool in hand, Camillo Golgi began to cellularly detail the brain and employ techniques to perfect axonal microscoping. Ludwig Edinger took advantage of this and came up with a new branch of anatomy called comparative neuroanatomy. Edinger held that vertebrates evolved in a linear progressive series. He also thought that changes in the brain were based on a series of additions and differentiations and that the most highly, complex brains were those that were the most encephalized. The period of 1885-1935 was an explosion of ideas in comparative neuroanatomy. This era culminated in the publication of "The Comparative Anatomy of the Nervous System" by Arienns, Kappers, Huber, and Cosby. This paper influenced Tilly Edinger and she later became the founder of paleoneurobiology.

=== Tilly Edinger ===
Ottilie "Tilly" Edinger was born in Frankfurt, Germany, in 1897. Her father Ludwig Edinger, himself a pioneer in comparative neurology, provided Tilly with invaluable exposure to his field and the scientific community at large. Tilly had many private tutors before attending Schiller-Schule, the only secondary school for girls in Frankfurt at that time. Tilly Edinger continued her schooling with university studies in zoology, geology, and paleontology. While preparing her doctoral dissertation, Edinger encountered a natural brain endocast of Nothosaurus, a marine reptile from the Mesozoic era. Edinger's first paper, published in 1921, centered on the characteristics of the Nothosaurus specimen. Prior to the publication of her work, inferences about the evolution of the vertebrate brain were made exclusively through comparative anatomy of extant fish, amphibian, reptile, bird, and mammal brains. Tilly Edinger's background in neurology and paleontology paved the way for her to integrate comparative anatomy and stratigraphic sequence, thus introducing the concept of time to neurology and creating the field of paleoneurobiology. The field was formally defined with the publication of Die fossilen Gehirne (Fossil Brains) in 1929 which compiled knowledge on the subject that had previously been scattered in a wide variety of journals and treated as isolated events.

While still in Germany, Edinger began studying extant species from a paleoneurobiological perspective by making inferences about evolutionary brain development in seacows using stratigraphic and comparative anatomical evidence. Edinger continued her research in Nazi Germany until the night of November 9, 1938, when thousands of Jews were killed or imprisoned in what became known as Kristallnacht. Although a visa was not immediately available for immigration to the United States, with the help of friends and colleagues who valued her work, Edinger was able to immigrate to London where she translated German medical texts into English. Eventually her visa quota number was called and she was able to immigrate to the United States where she took on a position as a research fellow at Harvard's Museum of Comparative Zoology.

Her contributions to the field of paleoneurobiology include determining the extent to which endocasts reflect the anatomy of ancient brains, the adequacy of comparative anatomy to interpret brain evolution, the ability of brain endocasts to predict the lifestyles of extinct organisms, and if brain size has increased over geological time; topics which are still being explored today. In her later years, Edinger corresponded with the next generation of paleoneurobiologists, which insured that the work from her 50-year career continued into the future. The pinnacle accomplishment of her career was the compilation of an annotated bibliography of paleoneurobiological papers published between 1804 and 1966. The bibliography, Paleoneurology 1804–1966, was completed and published by colleagues posthumously in 1975 due to the untimely death of Edinger from injuries sustained during a traffic accident in 1967.

=== Conflict between Holloway and Falk ===
Paleoneurobiologists Ralph L. Holloway and Dean Falk disagree about the interpretation of a depression on the Australopithecus afarensis AL 162-28 endocast. Holloway argues that the depression is a result of lipping at the lambdoid suture and that the sulcal patterns indicate cerebral organization moving toward a more human pattern, while Falk insists that the depression is the lunate sulcus in a position that is indicative of an ape-like sulcal pattern. The debate between these two scientists is not hinged solely on the AL 162-28 endocast, but rather extends to all australopithecine fossils, with Holloway insisting on the presence of hominid sulcal features, and Falk maintaining that the features are pongid in nature. The debate between Holloway and Falk is so intense that between 1983 and 1985, they published four papers on the identification of the medial end of the lunate sulcus of the Taung endocast (Australopithecus africanus), which only further strengthened the division between each scientist's respective opinion. Although there have been no definitive conclusions about the fossils in question, many techniques were created or critically analyzed and refined as a result of the conflict. These new techniques in endocast analysis included the use of stereoplotting to transfer sulci between differently shaped endocasts, measurement of indexes from photographs rather than directly from specimens, and confounding of measurements taken directly from specimens and those taken from photographs.

== Brain endocasts ==
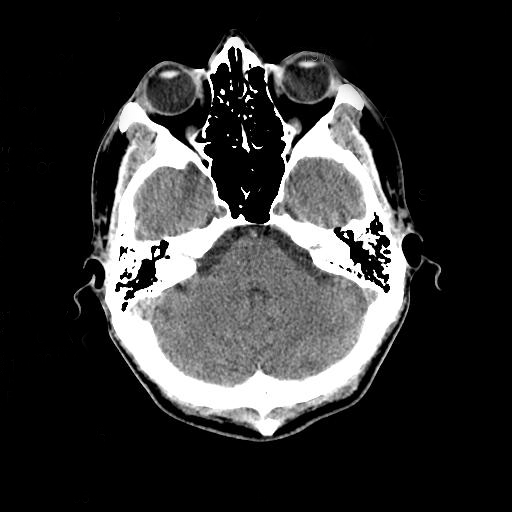
Normal human brain CT scan

A brain endocast is the imprintation of the inner features of a cranium that captures the details created from pressure exerted on the skull by the brain itself. Endocasts can be formed naturally by sedimentation through the cranial foramina which becomes rock-hard due to calcium deposition over time, or artificially by creating a mold from silicon or latex that is then filled with plaster-of-Paris while sitting in a water bath to equalize forces and retain the original shape. Natural endocasts are very rare; most of those that are studied are the result of artificial methods. Although the name implies that it is a copy of the once living brain, endocasts rarely exhibit convolutions due to buffering by the pia mater, arachnoid mater, and dura mater that once surrounded and protected the brain tissue. Furthermore, not all endocasts are created from a complete cranial fossil and subsequently, the missing parts are approximated based on similar fossils. In some cases, fragments from several fossils of the same species are used to construct a single endocast.

More recently, computed tomography has played a large role in reconstructing endocasts. The procedure is non-invasive and has the advantage of being able to analyze a fossil in record time with little risk of damaging the fossil under review. CT imaging is achieved through the application of x-rays to produce tomographs, or sectional density images, which are similar to the images produced during MRI scans. CT scans use slices approximately 1 mm thick to reconstruct a virtual model of the specimen. This method is especially useful when a fossil cranium is occupied by a natural endocast that cannot be removed without destroying the skeletal portions of the fossil. Because the cranium and its contents are of different densities, the endocranial cavity and its unique traits can be reconstructed virtually.

Radiographic technique such as computed tomographic imaging, or CT scans, coupled with computer programming have been used to analyze brain endocasts from as early as 1906. Recent development of advanced computer graphics technology have allowed scientists to more accurately analyze of brain endocasts. M. Vannier and G. Conroy of Washington University School of Medicine have developed a system that images and analyzes surface morphologies in 3D. Scientists are able to encode surface landmarks that allows them to analyze sulcal length, cortical asymmetries and volume. Radiologist, paleoanthropologists, computer scientists in both the United States and Europe have collaborated to study such fossils using virtual techniques.

== Methods of research ==
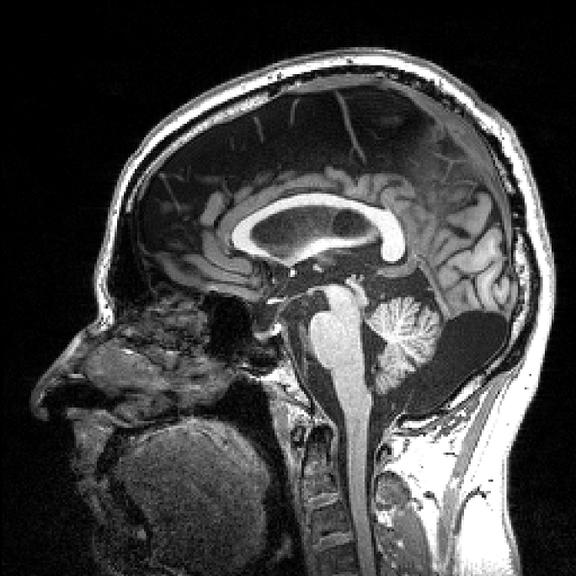
Sagittal view of a human brain through MRI

Paleoneurobiology revolves around the analysis of endocasts. Much of this analysis is focused on interpreting sulcal patterns, which is difficult because traces are often hardly recognizable, and there are no clear landmarks to use as reference points. Furthermore, the only clear reference plane is the sagittal plane one, which is marked by distinct cerebral asymmetries. Since the obtaining of clear data from fossil details is usually very difficult, much debate arises over interpretations. Experience is often an important factor in endocast analysis. Therefore, a large portion of the field of paleoneurobiology arises out of developing more detailed procedures that increase the resolution and the reliability of interpretations.

=== Overall brain volume ===
Statistical analysis of brain endocasts gives information on the increases in overall brain volume ("endocranial volume"). Because endocasts are not exact replicas, or exact casts, of a once-living brain, computer algorithms and CT scans are needed to calculate endocranial volume. The calculated endocranial volume includes the meninges, cerebrospinal fluid, and cranial nerves. Therefore, these volumes end up larger than the once-living brain. This information is useful for calculating relative brain size, RBS, and encephalization quotient, EQ. The corresponding body weight of the subject must also be known to calculated RBS. RBS is calculated by dividing the weight of the brain by body weight. EQ can be determined several different ways depending on the data set used. For example, Holloway and Post calculate EQ by the following equation:

$EQ = \frac{\operatorname{Brain weight}}{\operatorname{0.12}\cdot\operatorname{Body weight}^{0.66}}$

Brain volume is prominent in the scientific literature for discussing taxonomic identification, behavioral complexity, intelligence, and dissimilar rates of evolution. In modern humans, cranial capacity can vary by as much as 1000 cc, without any correlation to behavior. This degree of variation is almost equivalent to the total increase in volume from australopithecine fossils to modern humans, and brings into question the validity of relying on cranial capacity as a measurement of sophistication.

Many paleoneurobiologists measure cranial capacity via the submersion method, in which displacement of water in a beaker is taken as the volume of the endocast. Scientists who believe that this method is not accurate enough will use a similar procedure in which a beaker with a spout is filled until it is full. The water displaced by the endocast is then weighed to determine the endocast volume. Although both of these techniques are significantly more precise than previous methods, scientists are optimistic that more advanced techniques such as computed tomography will provide greater accuracy of volume measurements.

=== Morphometric analysis ===
Morphometric analysis relies on chord and arc measurements of the endocast surface. Length, width, bregma-basion, and height measurements of an endocast are taken with spreading calipers. Frontal lobe, parietal lobe, and occipital lobe chord length (the length of the lobe at its widest point along the midsagittal plane) are measured using a dioptograph in which landmarks are projected onto a two-dimensional surface. Measurements may be skewed if the orientation of the endocast has not been properly determined before the dioptograph is made. Geometric morphometrics (systems of coordinates superimposed over the measurements of the endocast) are often applied to allow comparison between specimens of varying size. Measurements may also be taken in reference to Broca's area, height of the endocast at 25% intervals of the maximum length, and the vault module (mean of maximum length, width, and middle height). Although other measurements may be taken, the choice of landmarks are not always consistent between studies.

=== Convolution pattern and cerebral organization ===
Convolutions, the individual gyri and sulci that compose the folds of the brain, are the most difficult aspect of an endocast to accurately assess. The surface of the brain is often referred to as smooth and fuzzy, due to the meninges and vasculature that cover the brain's surface. It is possible to observe underlying gyri and sulci patterns if an endocast is accurately or preserved, but the uncertainty associated with these patterns often leads to controversy. Because the robust australopithecine fossils show these details, convolutions are included in the study of endocasts whenever appropriate.

=== Asymmetry ===
The degree of asymmetry between right and left hemispheres is a point of interest to most paleoneurobiologists because it could be linked to handedness or language development of the specimen. Asymmetries occur due to hemispherical specialization and are observed in both a qualitative and quantitative manner. The unevenness of the hemispheres, known as a petalia, is characterized by a lobe that is wider and/or protruding beyond the contralateral lobe. For example, a right-handed person typically has larger left occipital lobe and right frontal lobes than the contralateral lobes. Petalias also occur due to specialization in the communication centers of the frontal cortex of the brain in modern humans. Petalias in the occipital lobe are easier to detect than those in the frontal lobe. Certain asymmetries have been documented on Homo erectus specimens such as the Homo redolfensis specimen from 1.8 million years ago that resemble the same asymmetries from modern humans. Some gorillas have shown strong petalias, but they are not found in combination with other petalias as is almost always the case in humans. Scientists use the presence of petalias to show sophistication, but they are not a definitive indicator of evolution toward a more human brain.

=== Meningeal patterns ===
Although the meninges have no link to behavior, they are still studied within the realm of paleoneurobiology due to the high degree of conservation of meningeal patterns within a species which may serve as a way to determine taxonomy and phylogeny.

=== Endocranial vasculature ===
Because meningeal blood vessels comprise part of the outermost layer of the brain, they often leave vascular grooves in the cranial cavity that are captured in endocasts. Endocranial vasculature originates around the foramina in the skull and in a living body would supply blood to the calvaria and dura mater. The vasculature is so well preserved in some fossils that terminal branches of the circulatory system can be observed. Analysis of cranial vasculature concentrates on the anterior meningeal system of the frontal region, the middle meningeal system of the parieto-temporal and part of the anterior occipital region, and the cerebellar fossa system of the cerebellar region. In the course of hominid evolution, the middle meningeal system has undergone the most change. Although cranial vasculature has been exhaustively studied in the last century, there has been no consensus on an identification scheme for the branches and patterns of the vascular system resulting from little overlap of results between studies. As such, endocranial vasculature is better suited for inferring the amount of blood delivered to different parts of the brain.

=== Relative lobe size ===
It is impossible to determine accurate location of the central or precentral sulci from an endocast. Still it can provide a rough idea of lobe sizes.

== Significance ==
The study of paleoneurobiology allows researchers to examine the evolutionary nature of human encephalization. Traditionally, paleoneurobiologists have focused on determining the volume of the ancient brain and the patterns that emerged among related species. By finding these measurements, researchers have been able to predict the average body weight of species. Endocasts also reveal traits of the ancient brain including relative lobe size, blood supply, and other general insight into the anatomy of evolving species.

== Limitations ==
While paleoneurology is useful in the study of brain evolution, certain limitations to the information this study provides do exist. The limited scale and completeness of the fossil record inhibits the ability of paleoneurobiology to accurately document the course of brain evolution. Further, fossil preservation is necessary to ensure accuracy of the endocasts studied. Weathering, erosion, and overall gradual disfiguration may alter the naturally recovered endocasts or endocasts created from existing fossils. The morphology of the brain can also be difficult to both quantify and describe, further complicating the observations made from the study of endocasts. Additionally, paleoneurobiology provides very little insight into the actual anatomy within the brains of species studied; the study of endocasts is limited to the external anatomy only. The relationship among endocranial traits remains elusive. Comparative paleoeneurology reveals mostly only differences in endocranial size among related species, such as Gorilla gorilla. Since there is no proven direct relationship between brain size and intelligence, only inferences can be made regarding the developing behavior of ancient relatives of the genus Homo.

These limitations of paleoneurobiology are currently being dealt with by the development of more advanced tools to refine the study of endocasts.

== Studies of interest ==
=== Brain shape, intelligence, and cognitive performance ===
Recent studies by Emiliano Bruner, Manuel Martin-Loechesb, Miguel Burgaletac, and Roberto Colomc have investigated the connection between midsagittal brain shape and mental speed. This study incorporated human subjects' cognitive testing in relationship to extinct humans. They used 2D from 102 MRI-scanned young adult human for comparison. Such correlations are small, suggesting that the influence of midsagittal brain geometry on individual cognitive performance is negligible but still provides useful information of evolutionary traits of the brain. Areas associated with the parietal cortex appear to be involved in relationships between brain geometry and mental speed.

=== Degenerative diseases and functional disorder ===
Scientist J. Ghika believes use of paleoneurobiology is the best way to analyze several neurodegeneration leading to diseases such as Parkinson's disease, dyskinesias, gait disorders, Paget's disease of bone, dysautonomia and so on. A past study by S.I. Rapoport on Alzheimer's disease in Homo sapiens has shown the importance in using a darwinian perspective to better understand this disease itself and its symptoms. The aim is to determine the genetic mechanisms that lead to focal or asymmetrical brain atrophy resulting in syndromic presentations that affect gait, hand movements (any sort of locomotion), language, cognition, mood and behavior disorders.

== See also ==
- Evolution of nervous systems
- Paleobiology
- Paleoanthropology
- Paleontology
