= Ottilie Roederstein =

German-Swiss painter (1859–1937)

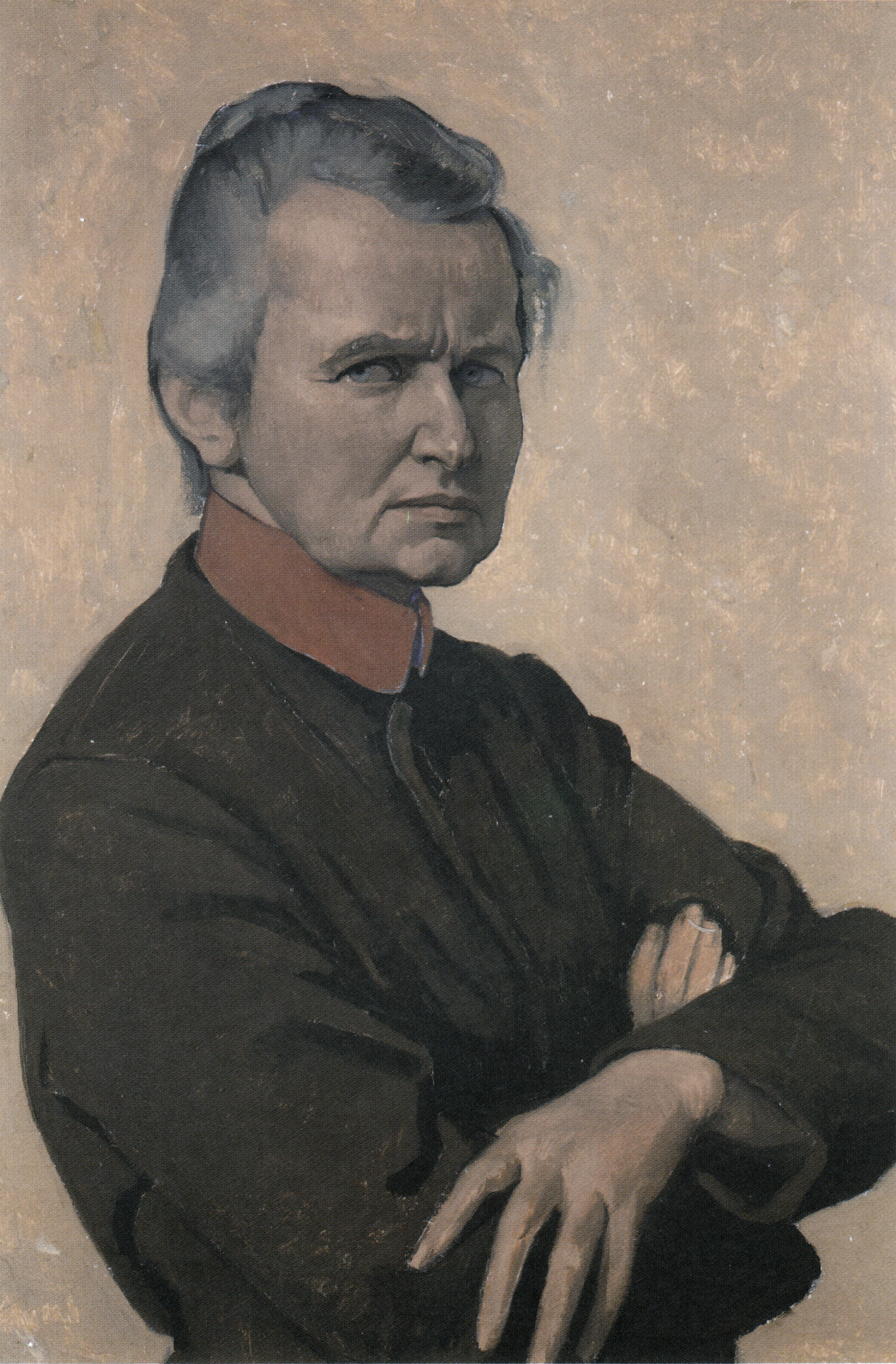
- Self-portrait (1918)
- Born: Ottilie Wilhelmine Roederstein; 22 April 1859; Zürich, Switzerland
- Died: 26 November 1937 (aged 78); Hofheim am Taunus, Germany
- Known for: Painting

Ottilie Wilhelmine Roederstein (22 April 1859 – 26 November 1937) was a German-Swiss painter. She was the long-time companion of Elisabeth Winterhalter, one of the first female doctors in Germany.

== Life ==
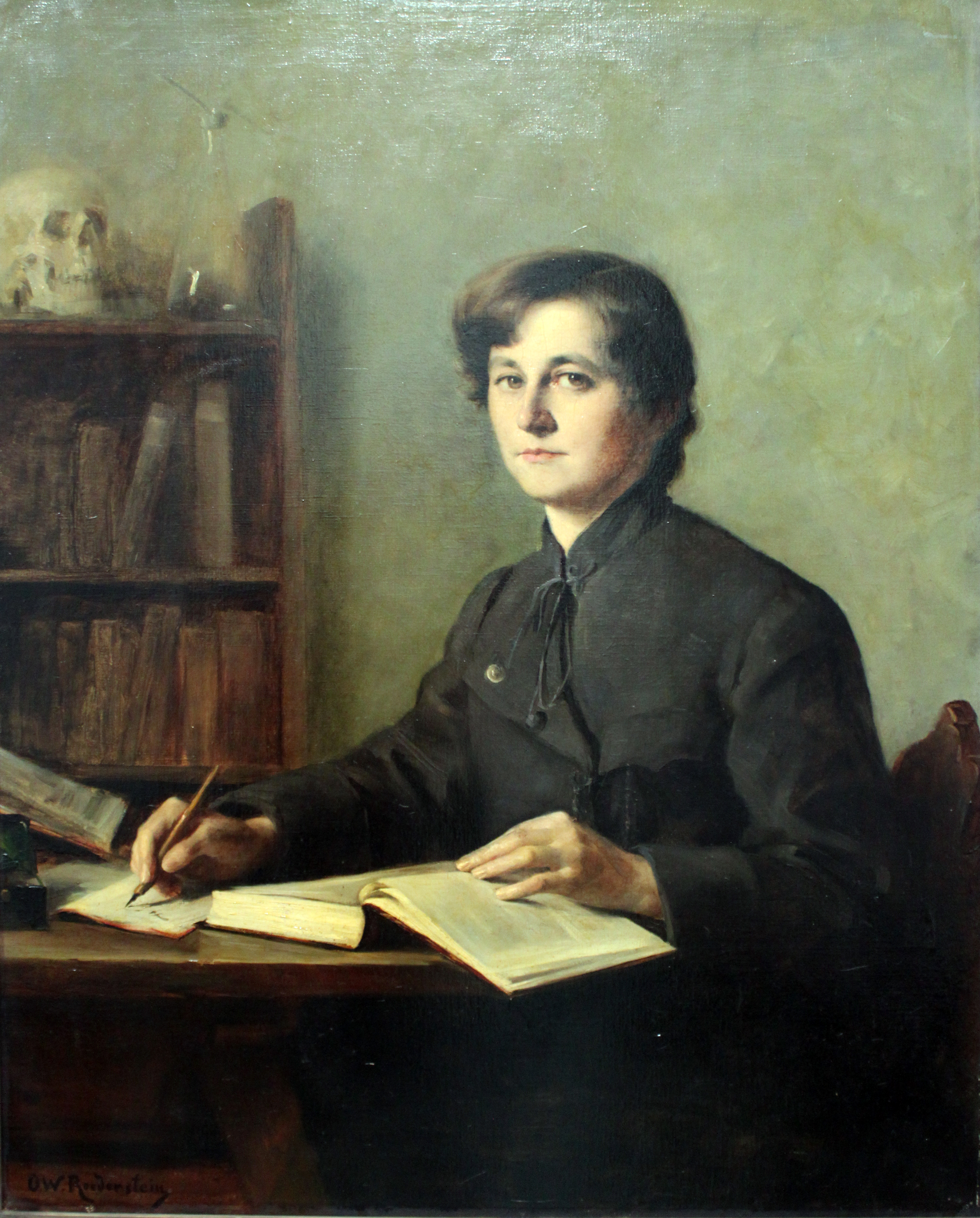
Portrait of Elisabeth Winterhalter (1887)

Roederstein was born in Zürich, Switzerland. She was the second daughter of a businessman who came from Germany to work as a representative for a Swiss textile company.

She was first attracted to painting when the now-forgotten Swiss painter Eduard Pfyffer (1836–1899) came to their home to do family portraits. This interest grew with visits to local museums. For a woman, training as a painter would have gone against contemporary social conventions. Her mother was especially opposed to her wishes, but persistence eventually won over her father, and in 1876, she was allowed to study with Pfyffer, so she would be close to home.

Her talent for portrait painting soon became obvious, and she quickly outgrew Pfyffer's studio. Her opportunity came when her sister Johanna married a businessman from Berlin. Johanna and her husband agreed to let her live with them there, and she found a place as a student in a special women's class given by Karl Gussow. In 1882, she had her first exhibition with an art dealer in Zürich, which was well received. That same year, she followed a friend to Paris, where she found a position in the studios of Carolus-Duran and Jean-Jacques Henner. By 1887, she was able to support herself with sales and commissions and no longer had to depend on her parents. She was a participant in the Salon and won a Silver Medal at the Exposition Universelle (1889). She exhibited her work at the Woman's Building at the 1893 World's Columbian Exposition in Chicago, Illinois.

After 1890, she moved to Frankfurt to be with her partner, Elisabeth Winterhalter; although she travelled widely (including a trip to Africa in 1913). She never lost track of her Swiss roots, however, and became an Honorary Citizen of Zürich in 1902. Five years later, she and Elisabeth settled in Hofheim am Taunus (a suburb of Frankfurt). Amongst her models was Gwen John, who was intrigued that Roederstein wore a shirt, jacket, and a fob watch. Roederstein's painting of her as "The Letter" was exhibited at the salon of the Société Nationale des Beaux-Arts in 1908. That same year, Roederstein and her partner helped to create the Schillerschule, Frankfurt's first school for girls. After the war, she did a number of portraits of women widowed by the war. She continued to exhibit regularly until 1931.

Roederstein died on 26 November 1937 in Hofheim am Taunus.

Her works feature in the collection of numerous museums, including among others: the Städel museum which holds a significant archive of her papers and photographs, Kunsthaus Zürich, Kunstmuseum Basel, Kunstmuseum Bern, Staatsgalerie Stuttgart, the Musée d'Art et d'Histoire (Geneva) and the Smithsonian American Art Museum.

== Gallery ==
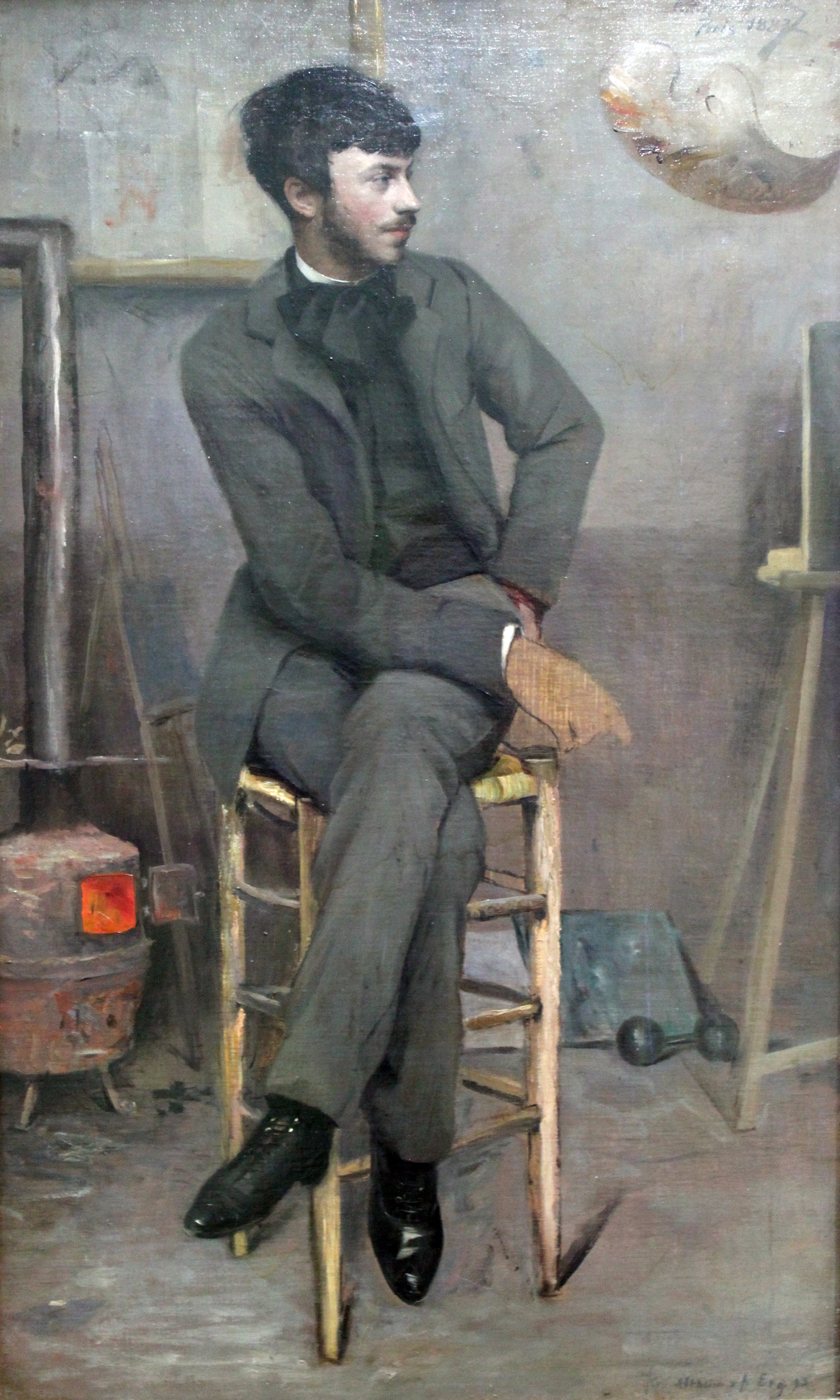
Portrait of an artist in his Parisian studio, 1887

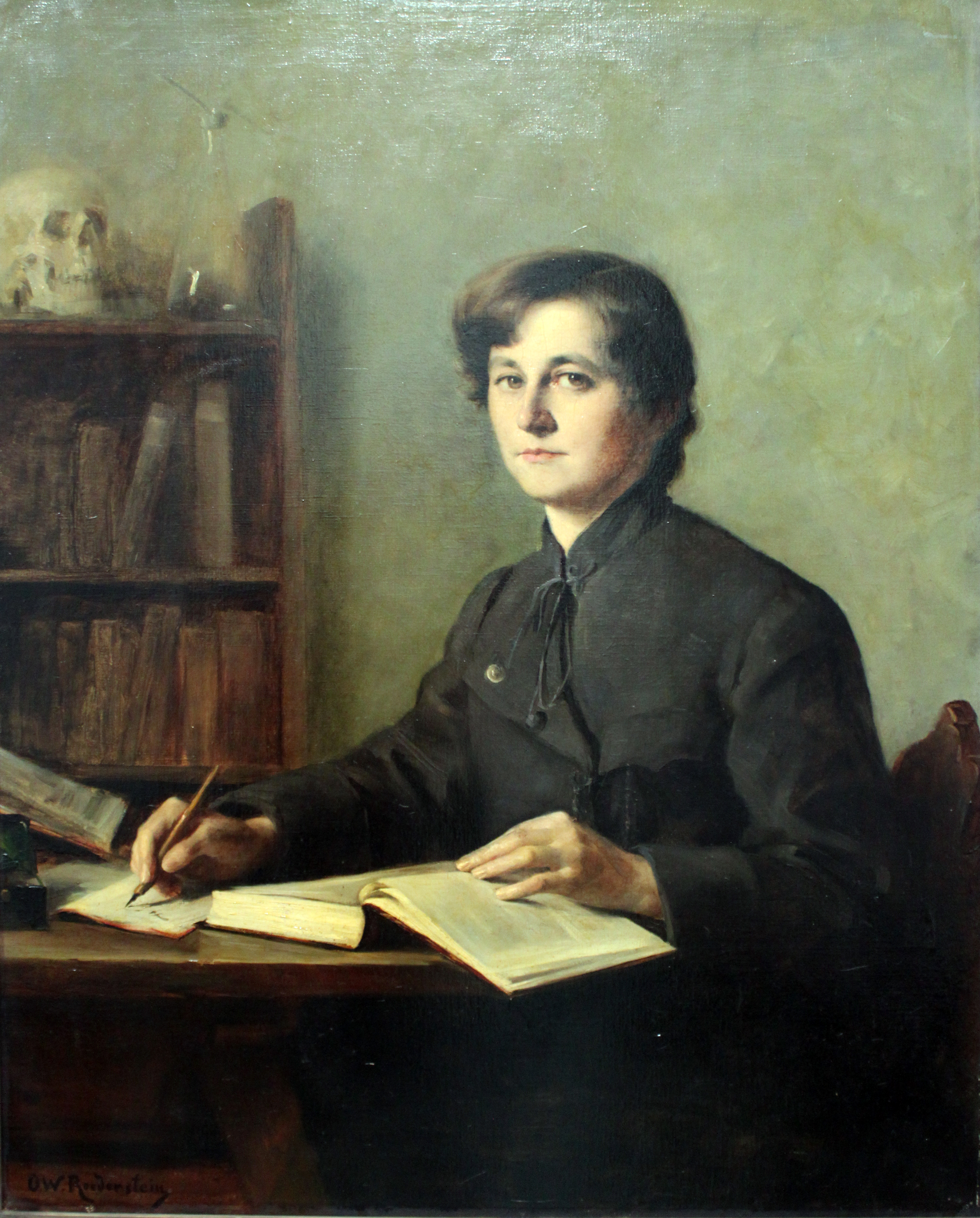
Portrait of Elisabeth Winterhalter, 1887, Städel museum

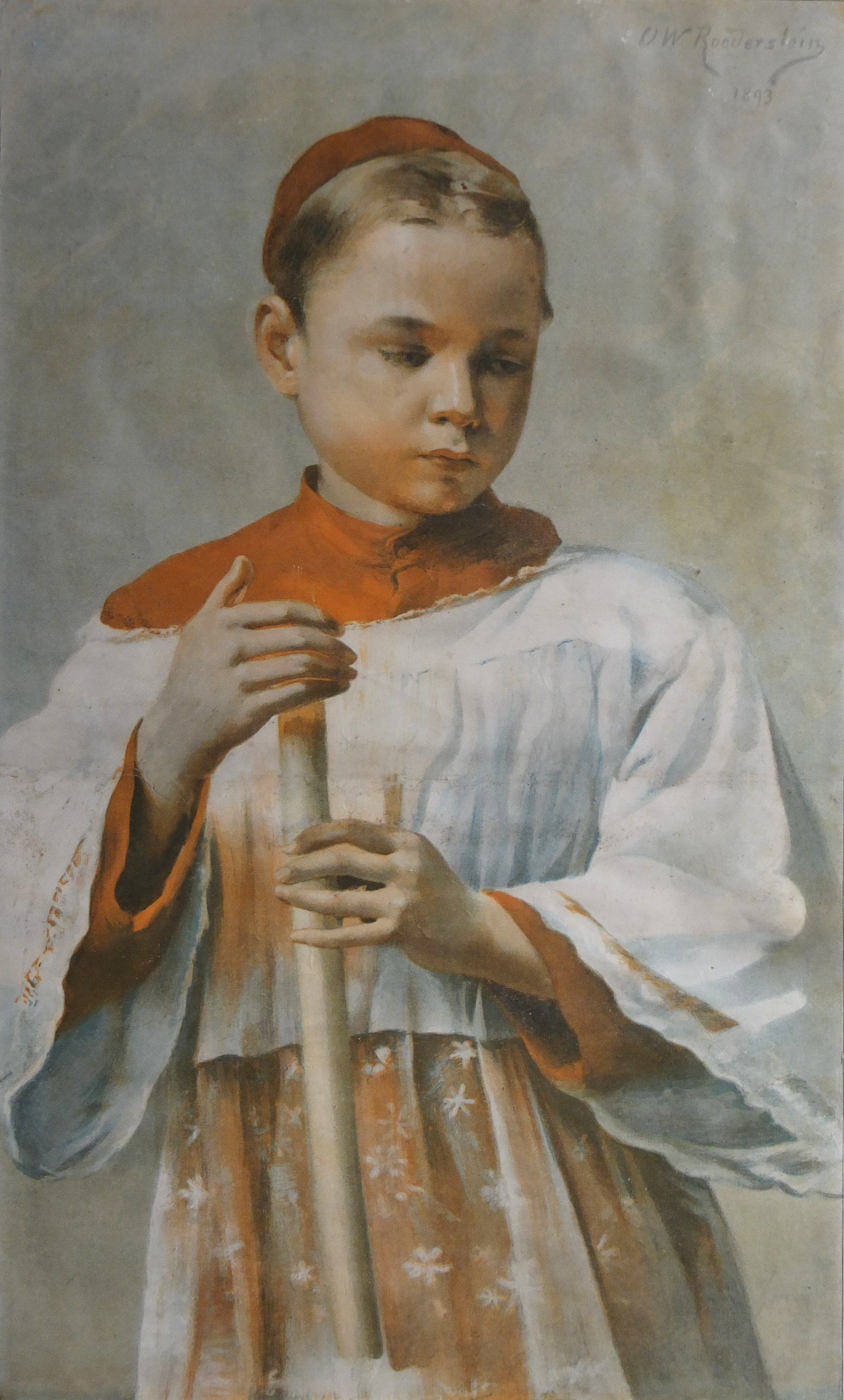
The choirboy, 1893

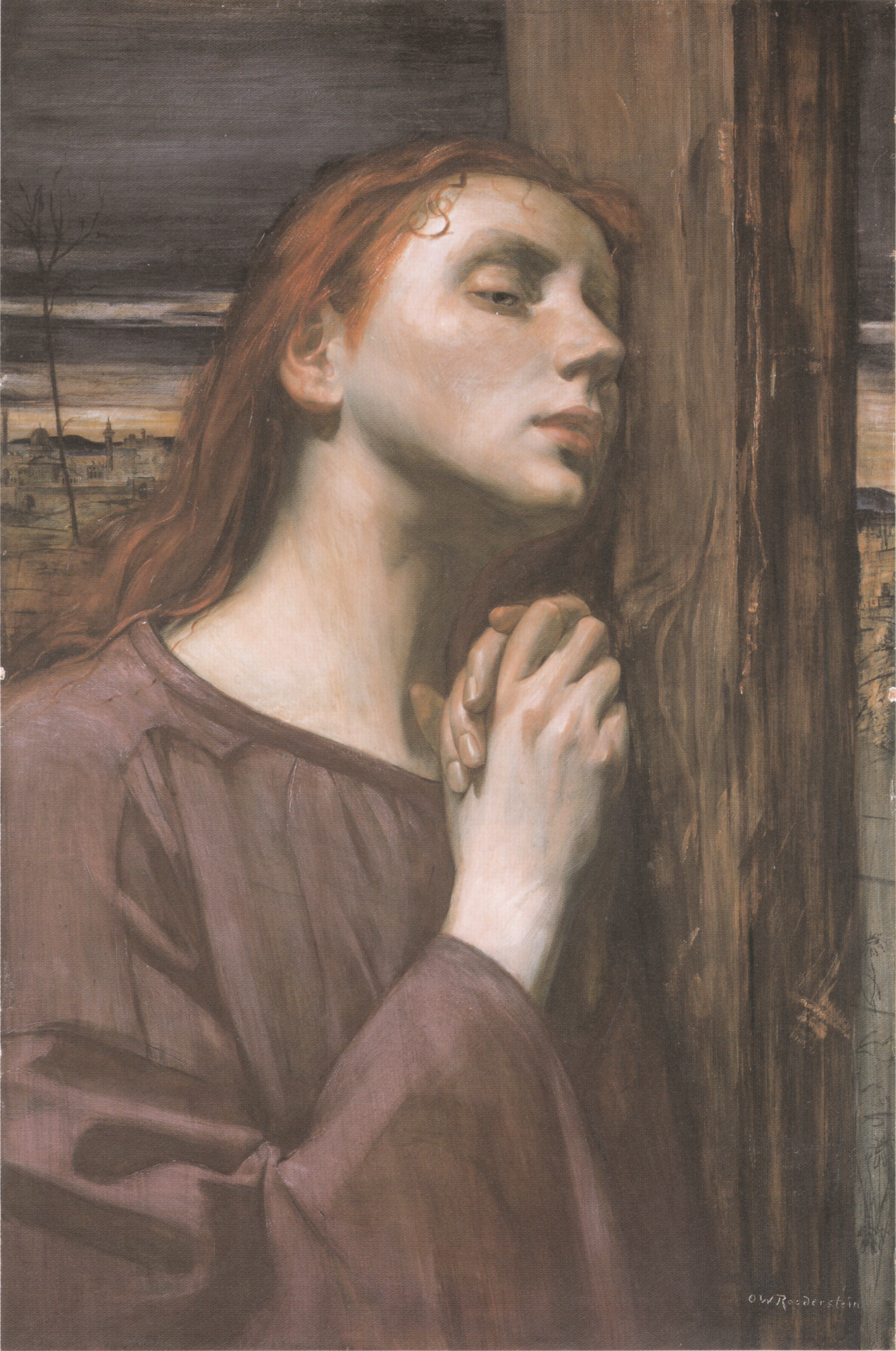
Magdelene praying by the cross, 1894

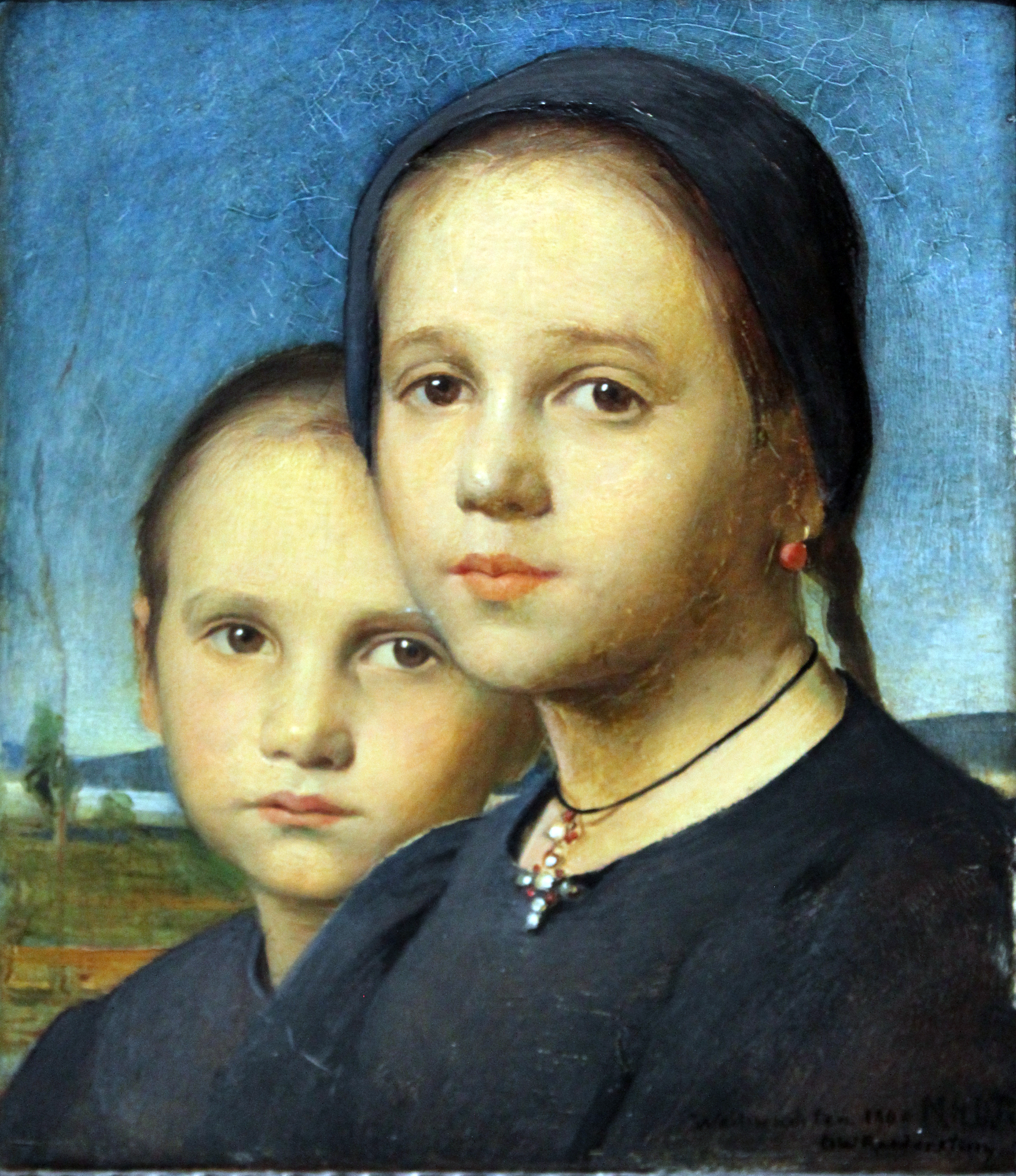
The two sisters, 1900

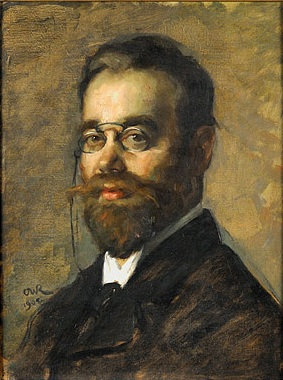
Doctor Ludwig Edinger, 1905

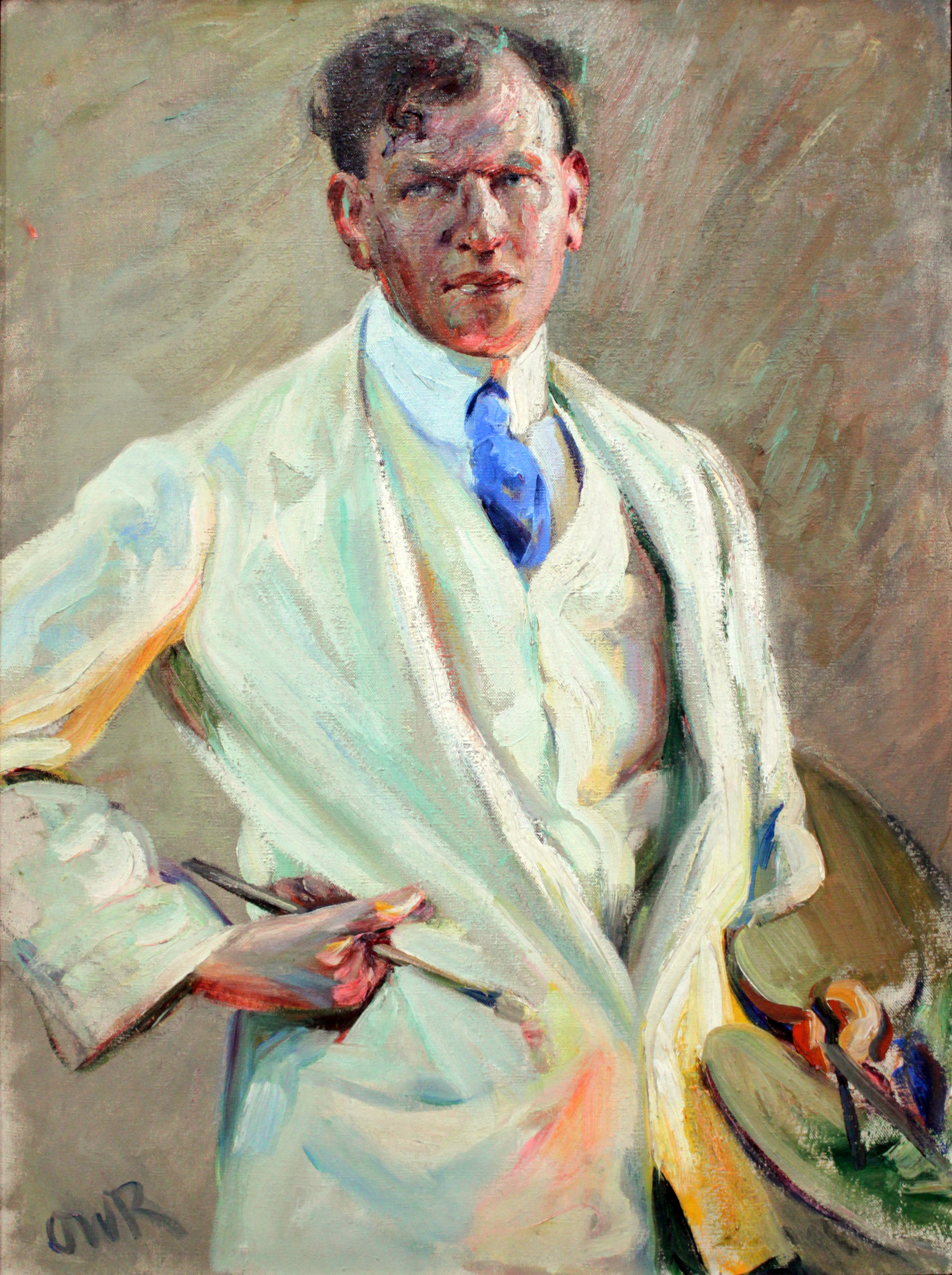
Portrait of Jacob Nussbaum, 1909, Städel museum

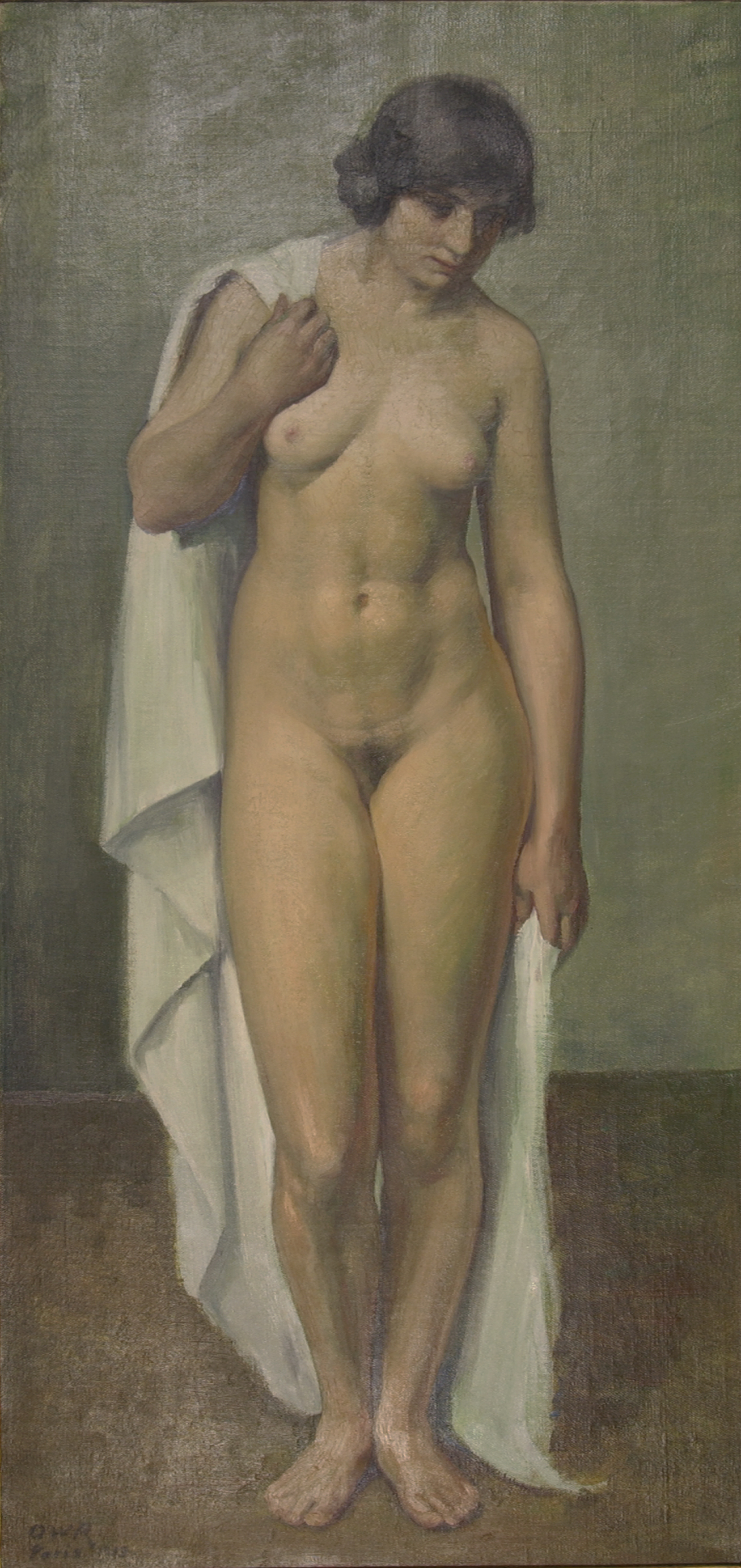
Young woman nude, Paris, 1913

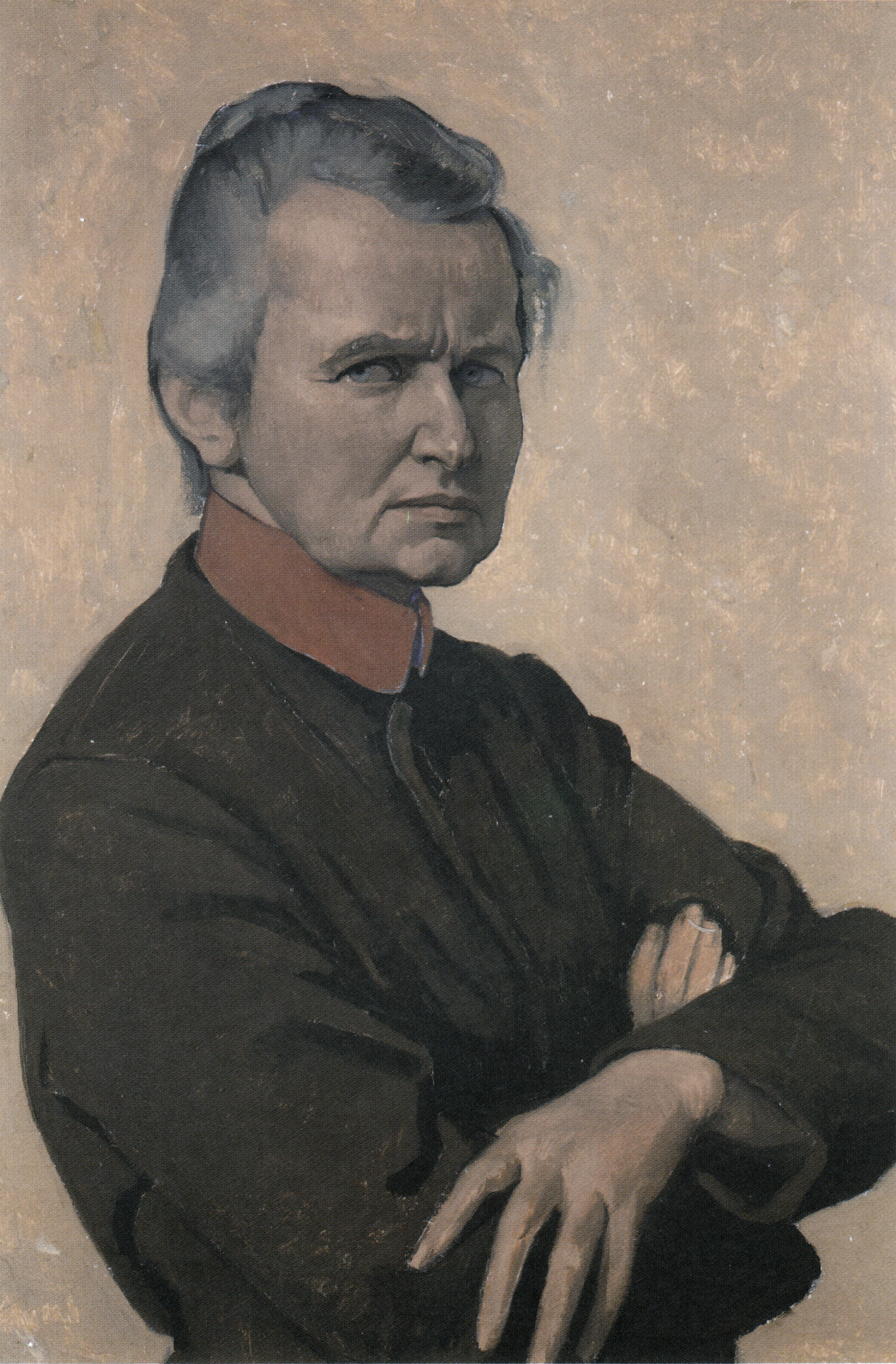
Selfportrait, 1918

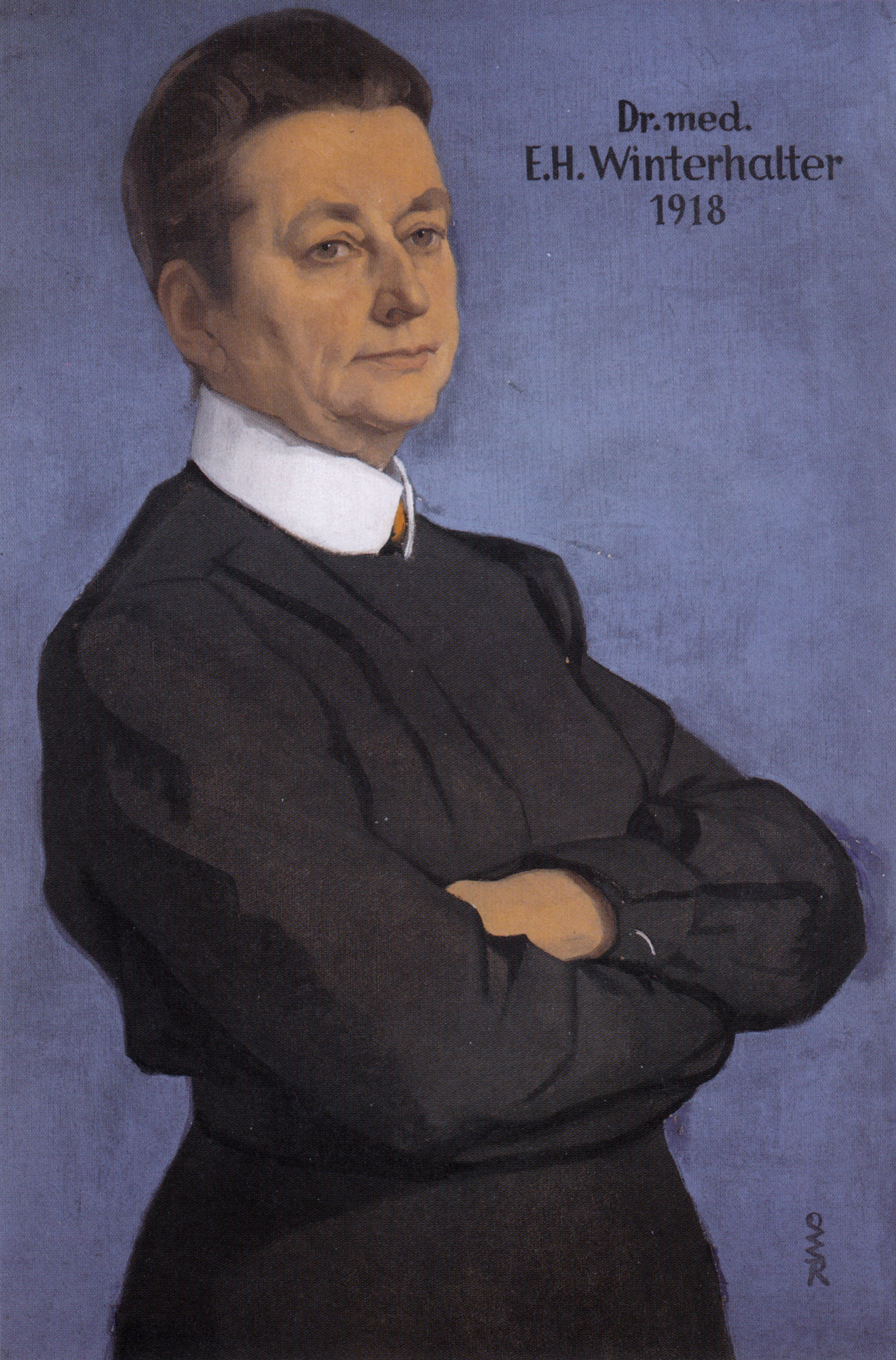
Portrait of Elisabeth Winterhalter, 1918

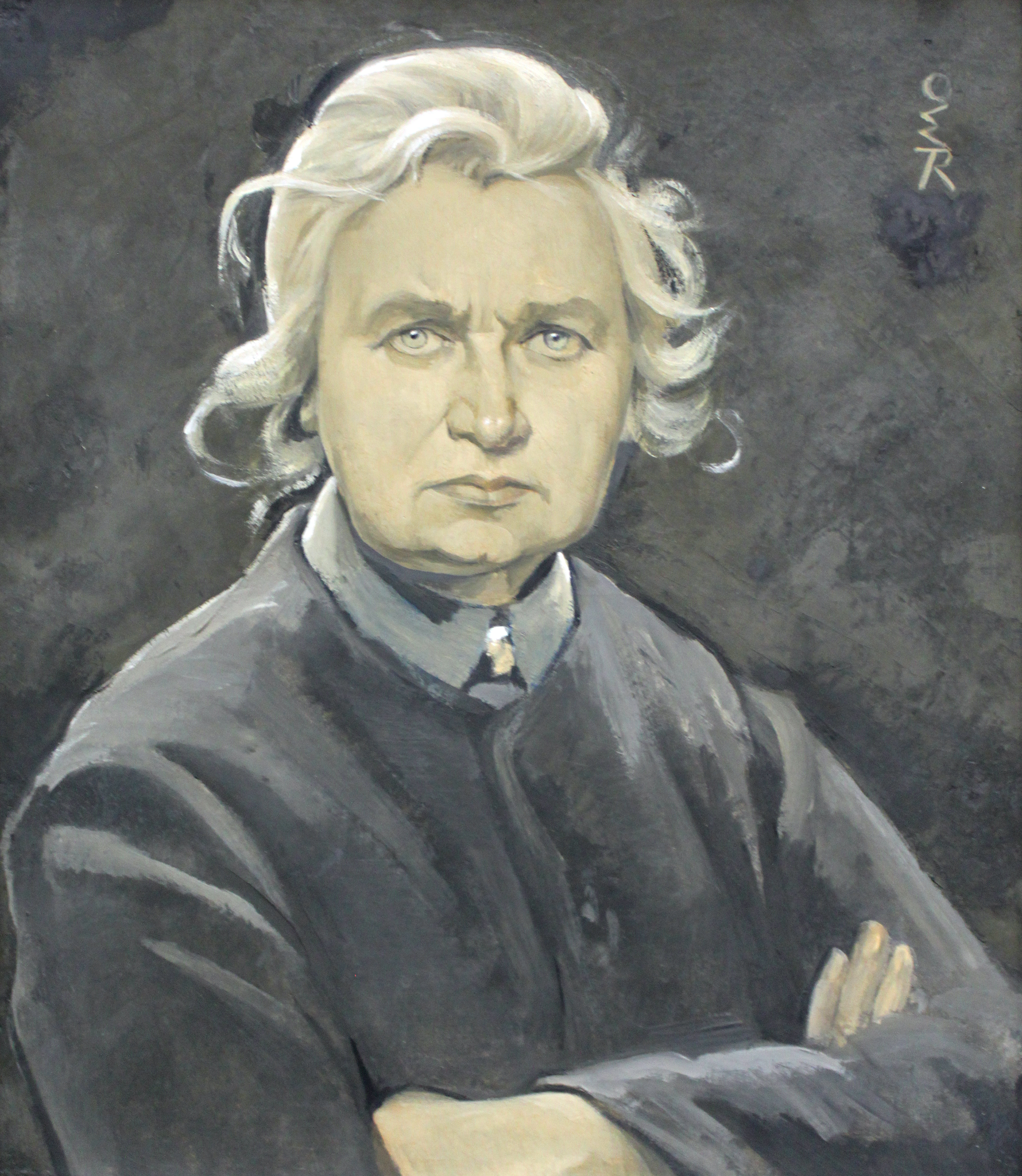
Selfportrait with arms crossed, 1926, Städel museum

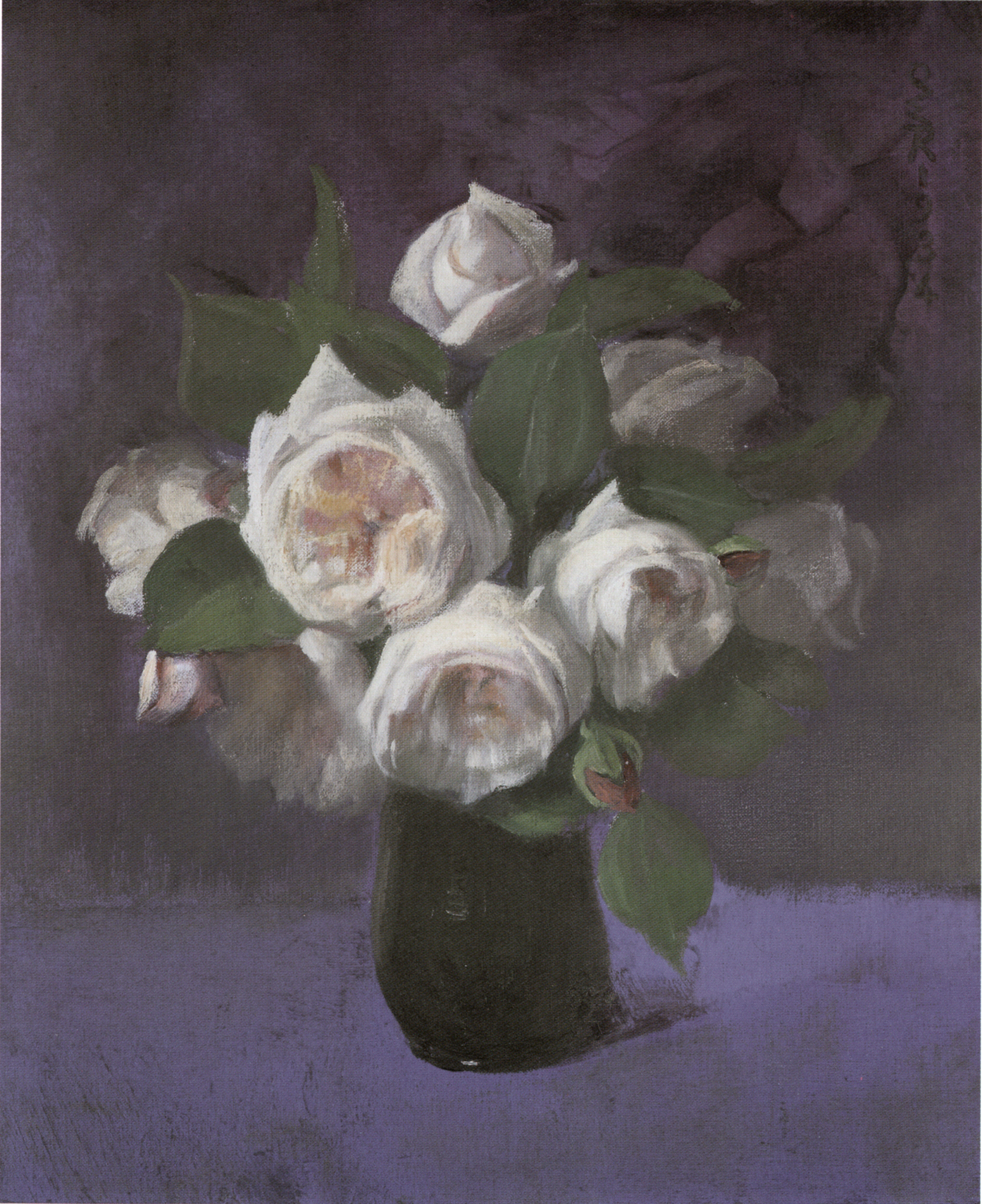
Bouquet of roses and violettes, 1934

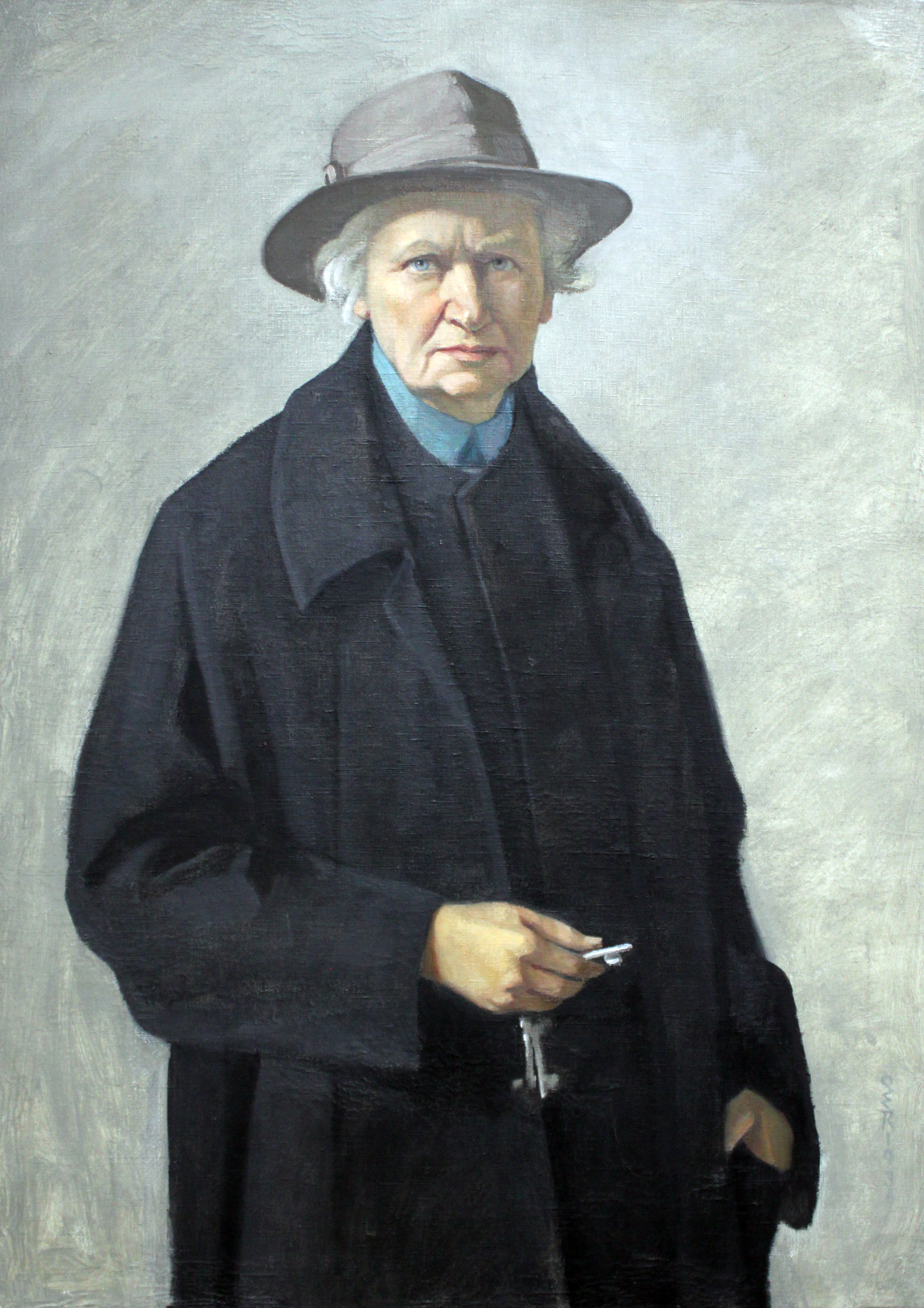
Selfportrait with keys, 1936, Städel museum
