= Ludwig Edinger =

German anatomist and neurologist

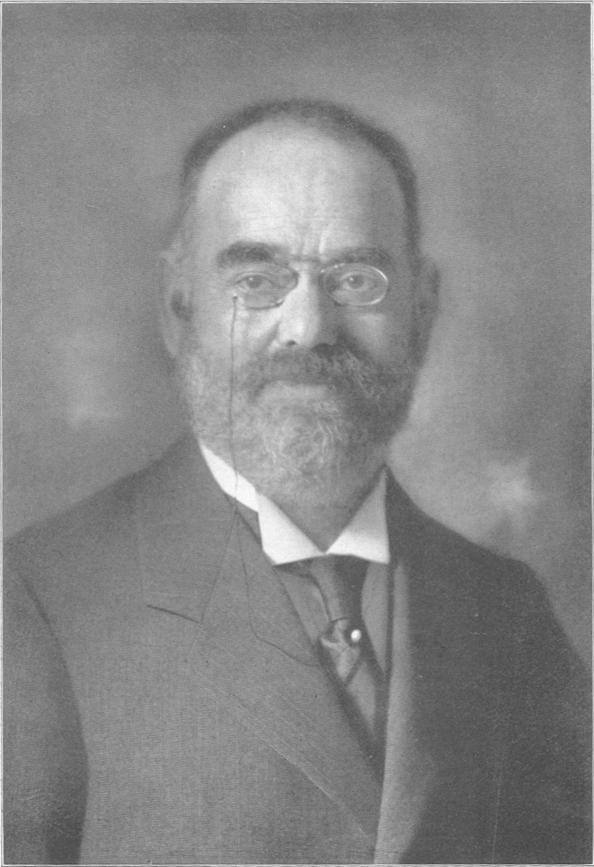
- Ludwig Edinger (1915 photo)
- Born: 13 April 1855} Worms, German Confederation
- Died: 26 January 1918 (aged 62); Frankfurt am Main, German Empire
- Occupations: Anatomist and neurologist
- Known for: Co-founding the University of Frankfurt

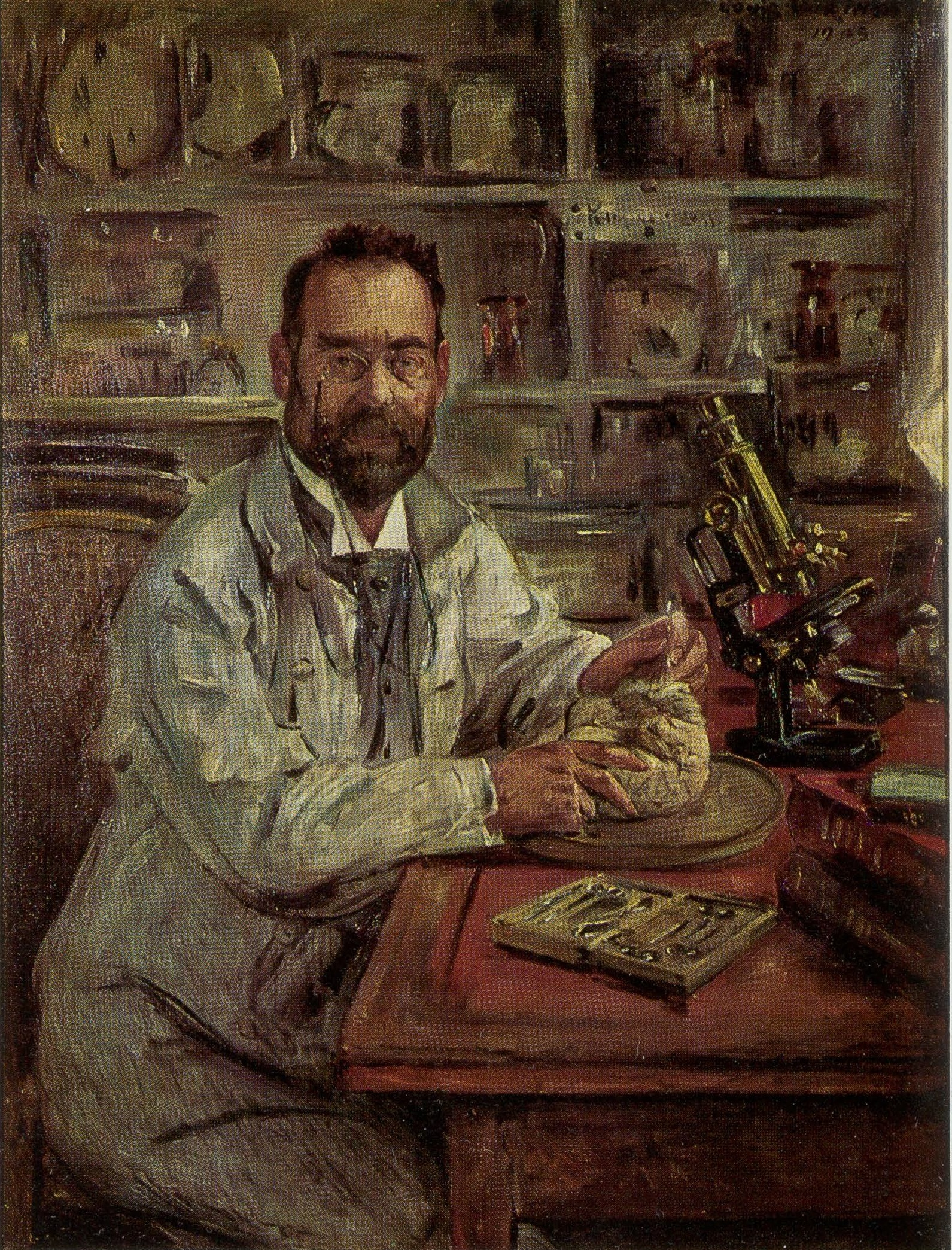
Portrait of Ludwig Edinger by Lovis Corinth (1909)

Ludwig Edinger (13 April 1855 – 26 January 1918) was an influential German anatomist and neurologist and co-founder of the University of Frankfurt. In 1914 he was also appointed the first German professor of neurology.

== Biography ==
Edinger was born into a Jewish family and grew up in Worms, where his father was a successful textile salesman and democratic congressman in the state parliament of Hesse-Darmstadt. His mother was the daughter of a physician from Karlsruhe. He was not ashamed that he started his career as a poor man. Indeed, he proposed free schooling for all children in 1873, but without success.

Edinger studied medicine from 1872 to 1877 in Heidelberg and Strasbourg. His studies into neurology began during his time as an assistant physician in Giessen (1877 - 1882). His habilitation was in 1881 about neurological researches. He became a docent for these themes. He worked in Berlin, Leipzig and Paris and opened his own practice for neurology in Frankfurt am Main in 1883.

Due to Edingers initiative in 1885, the pathologist Karl Weigert became director of the Dr. Senckenbergische Anatomie in Frankfurt. Weigert opposed antisemitism. Weigert gave his friend Edinger a place to work in his institute. In 1902, Edinger received enough space to start his own neurological department.

In 1909, after a dispute between Edinger and the Senckenberg foundation about the finances of the neurological institute, Edinger moved to the University of Frankfurt under the condition that he was responsible for the financing of the department. His problems had eased in 1886, when he married Anna Goldschmidt, the daughter of an old family of traditional Jewish bankers in Frankfurt; she received a large inheritance in 1906.

Edinger died suddenly on 26 January 1918 in Frankfurt of a heart attack. He had left instructions for his brain to be examined in his institute. The institute continued with the introduction of a foundation set-up by Edinger. The Neurology department of the Goethe University's Faculty of Medicine is named after him.

Edinger is credited with coining the terms "gnosis" and "praxis". These terms were later used in psychological descriptions of agnosia and apraxia. Also, he was the first to describe the ventral and dorsal spinocerebellar tracts and to distinguish the paleocerebellum from the neocerebellum.

== Terms ==
- "Edinger's tract": Conductive pathway for basic perceptions of pain, temperature, pressure and touch.
- "Edinger–Westphal nucleus: The accessory nucleus of the 3rd oculomotor nerve. Named with Karl Friedrich Otto Westphal; Edinger described it in the human fetal brain (1885), while Westphal described it in the adult brain two years later.
