= Frankfurt Main Cemetery =

Largest cemetery in Frankfurt, Germany

Coordinates: 50.08099°N 08.41055°E

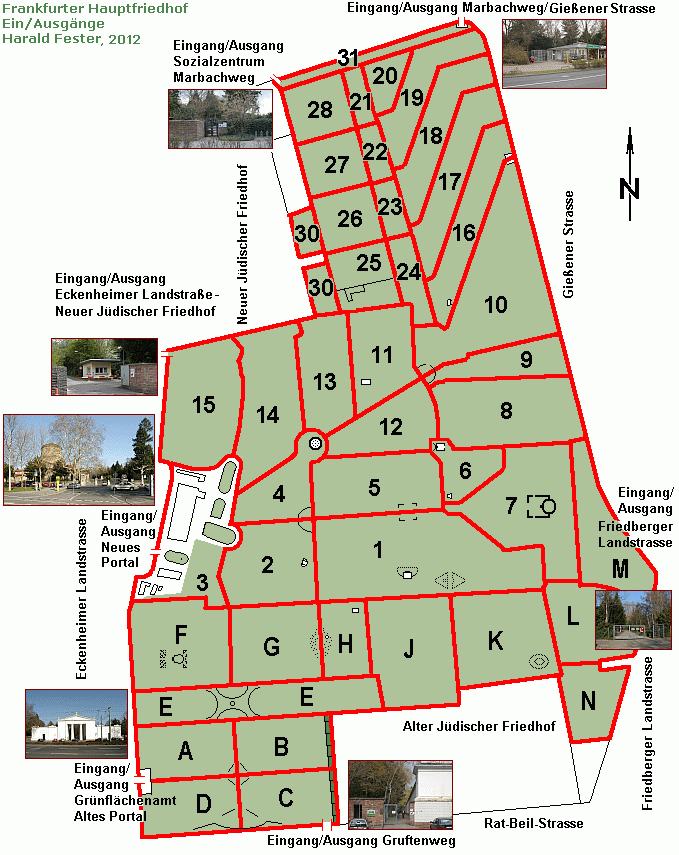
Map of the cemetery

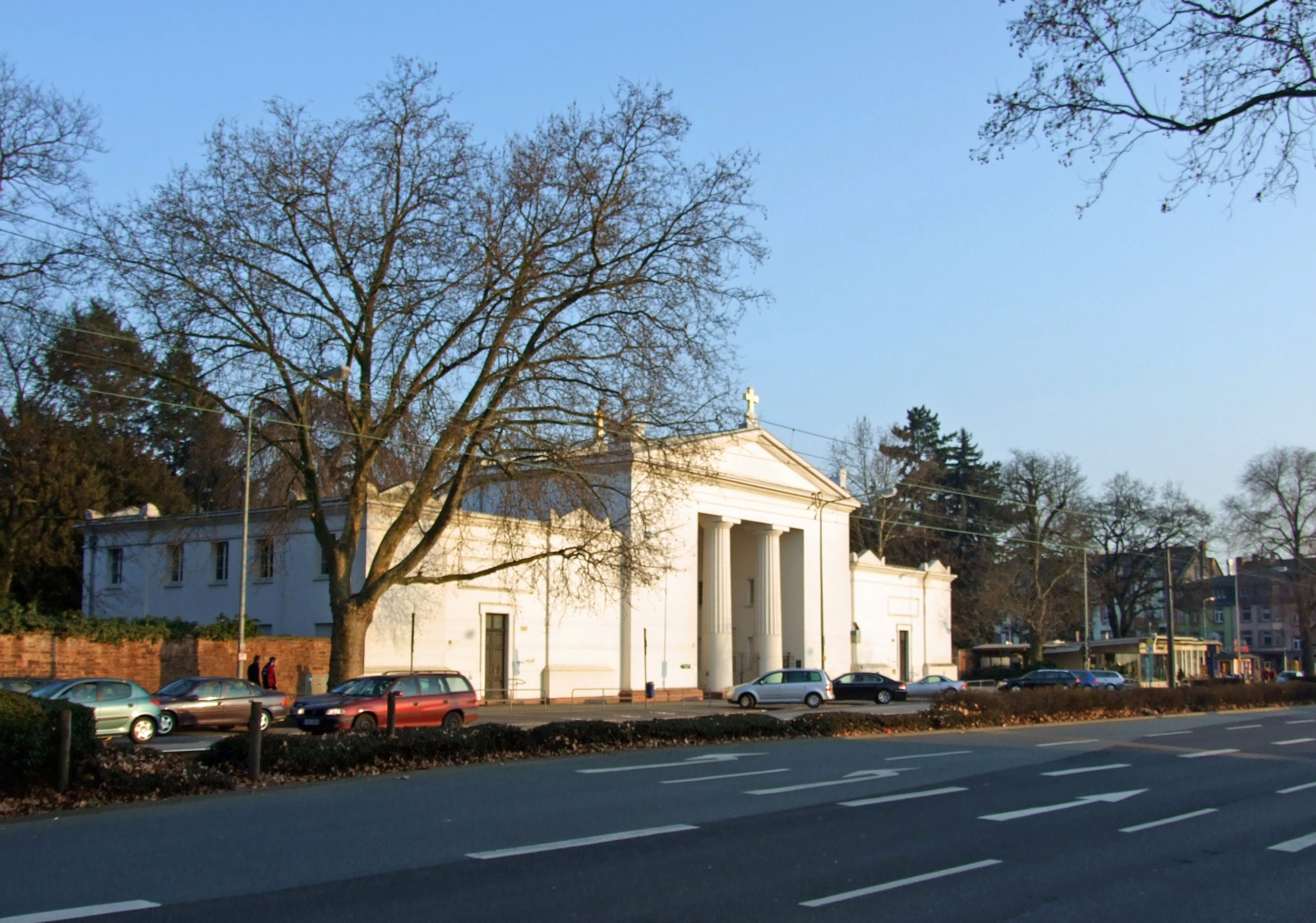
Old portal

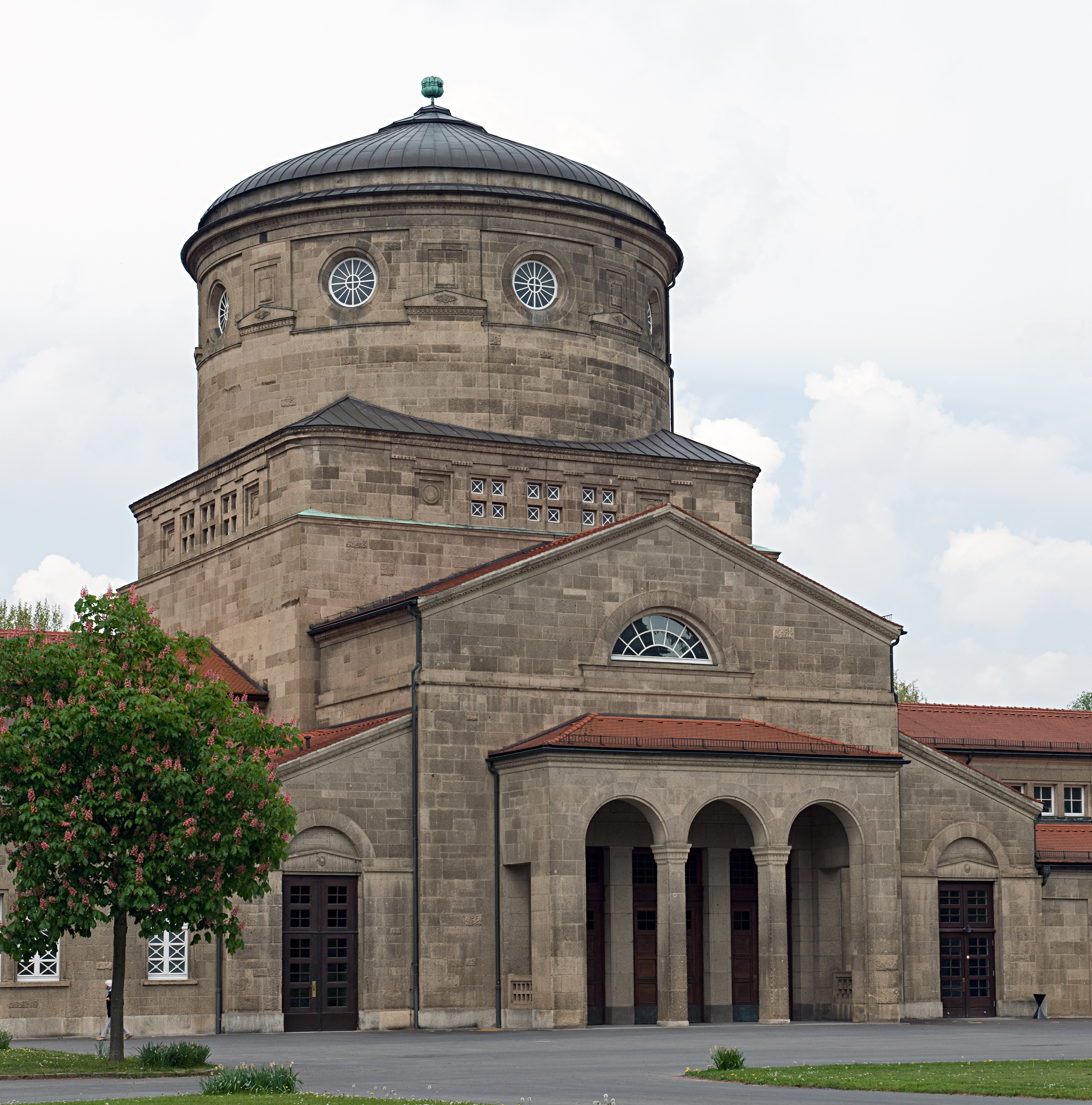

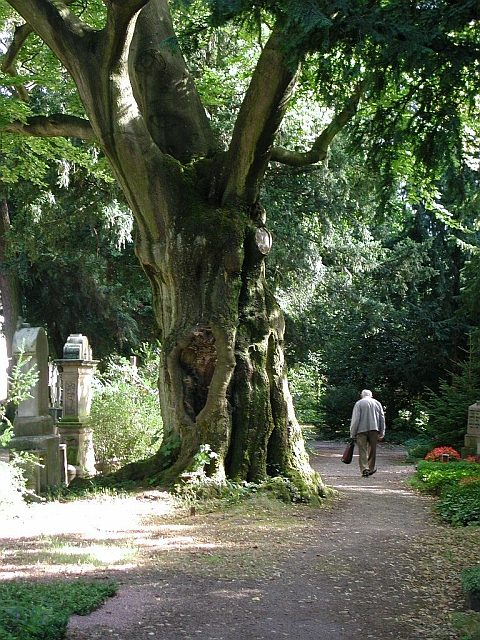

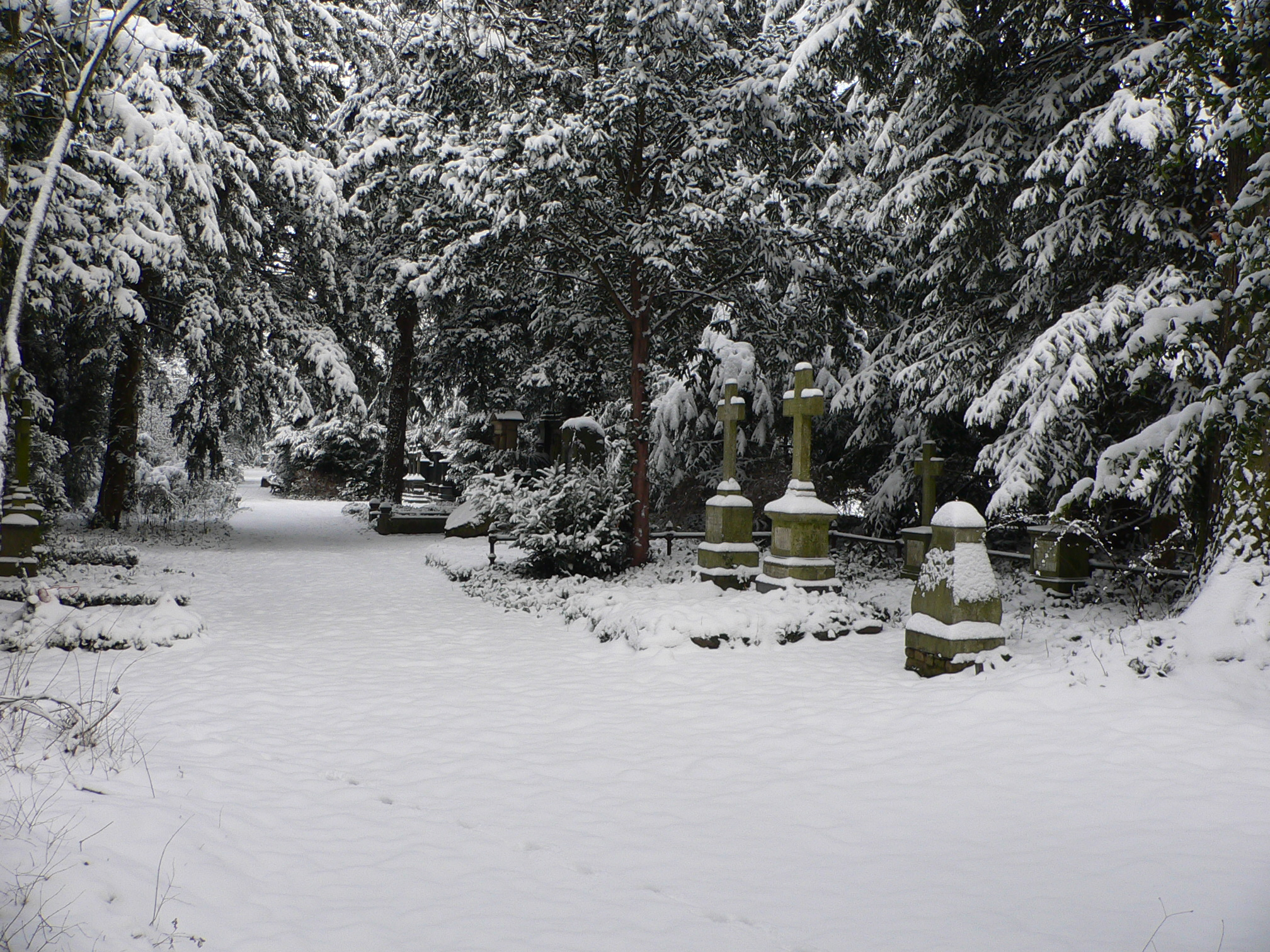

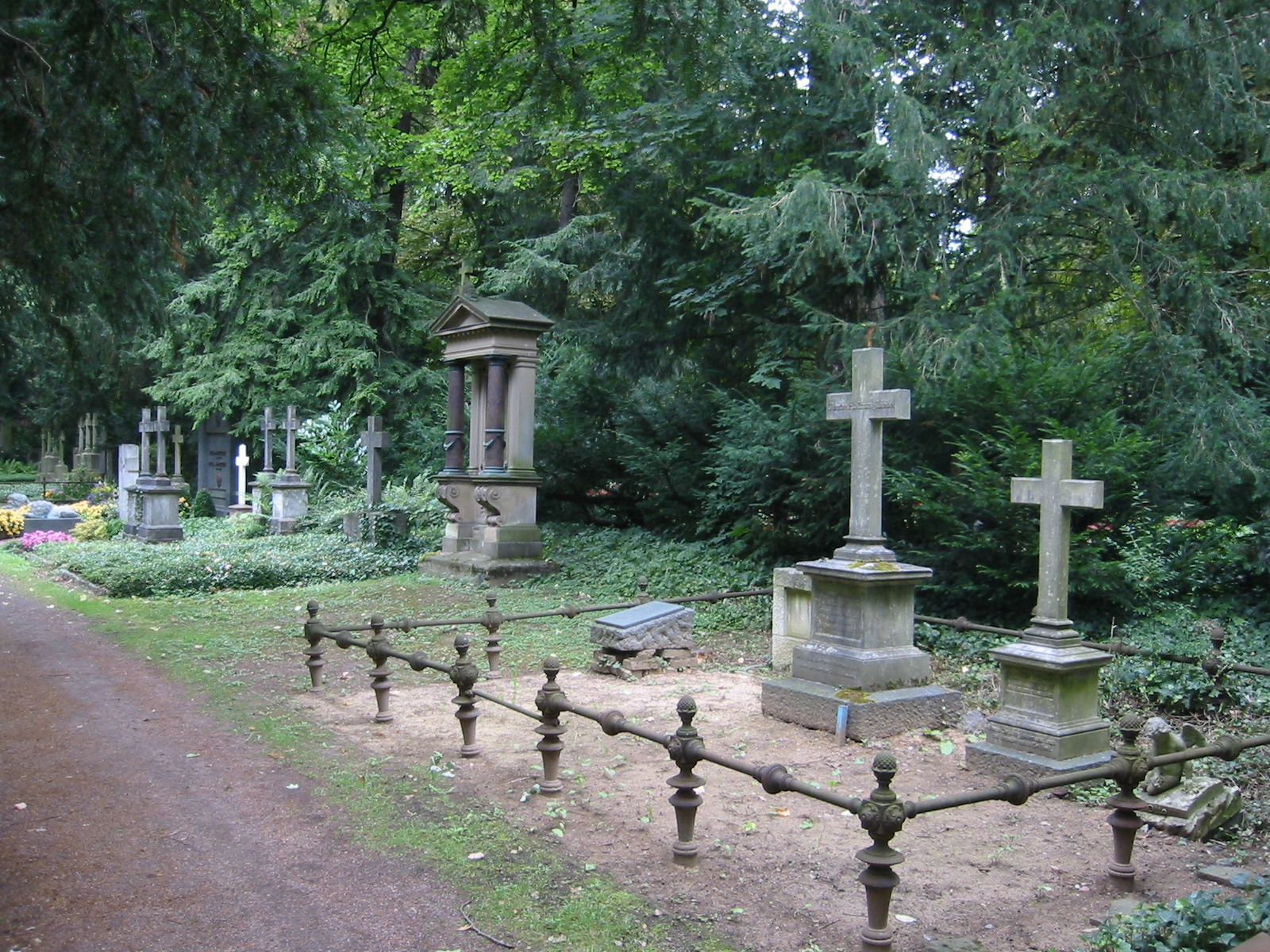

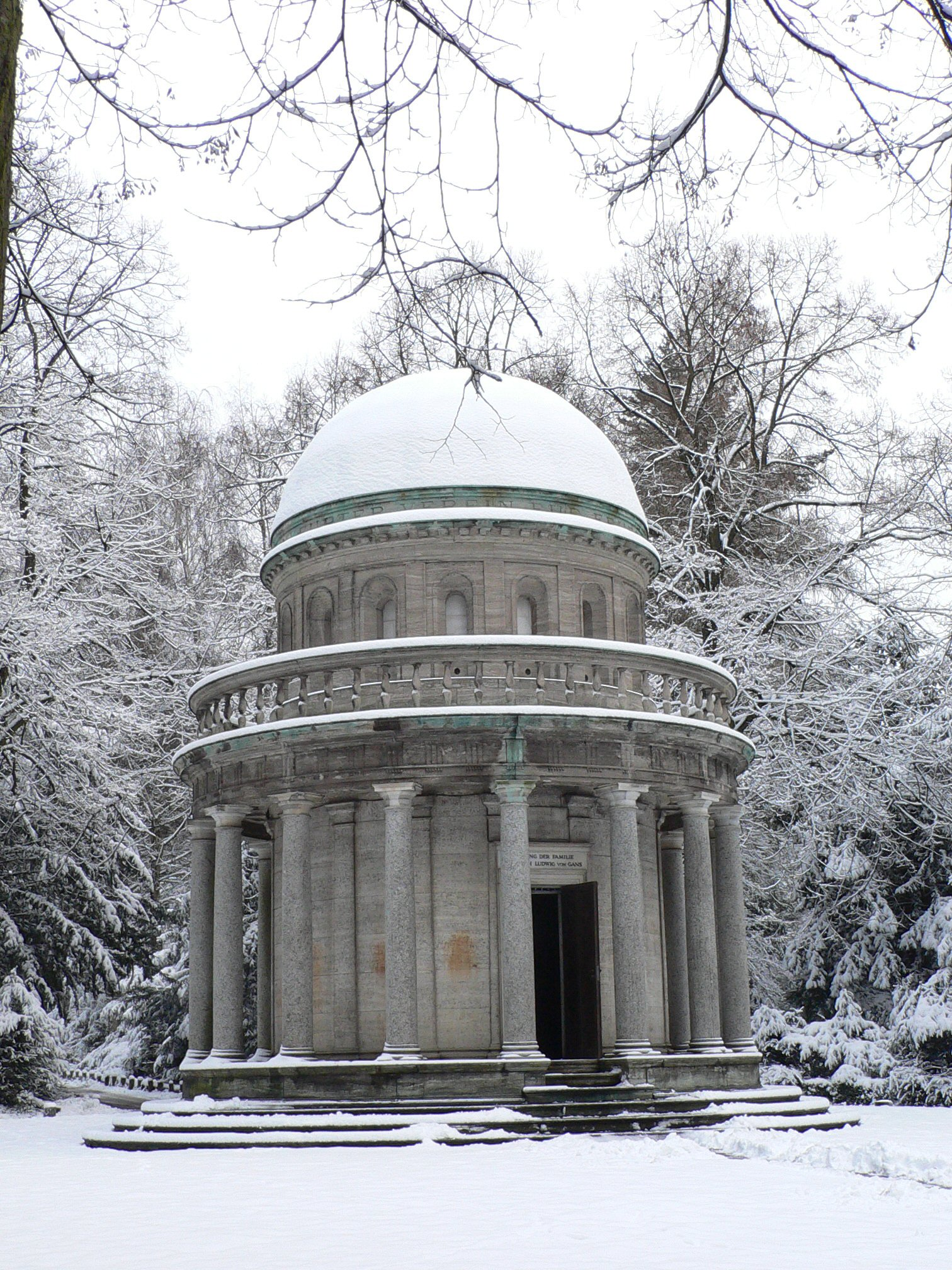
Private mausoleum of the Gans family of industrialists.

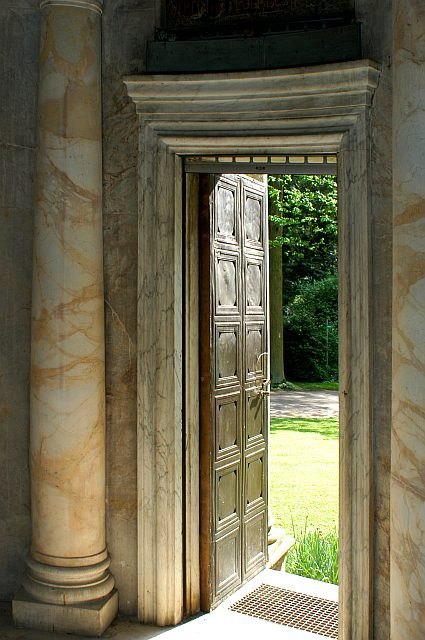
The Gans mausoleum

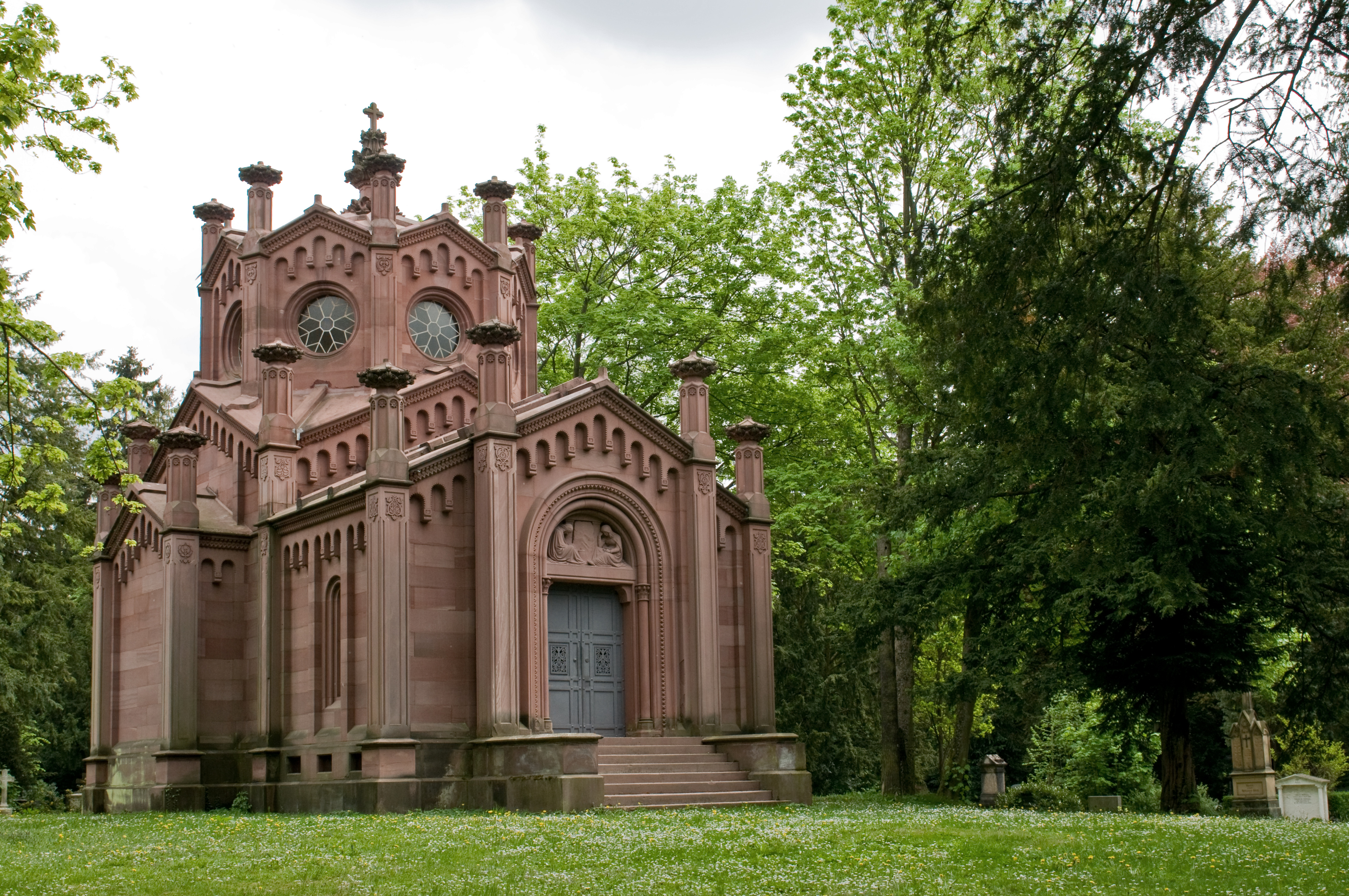
Mausoleum Reichenbach-Lessonitz

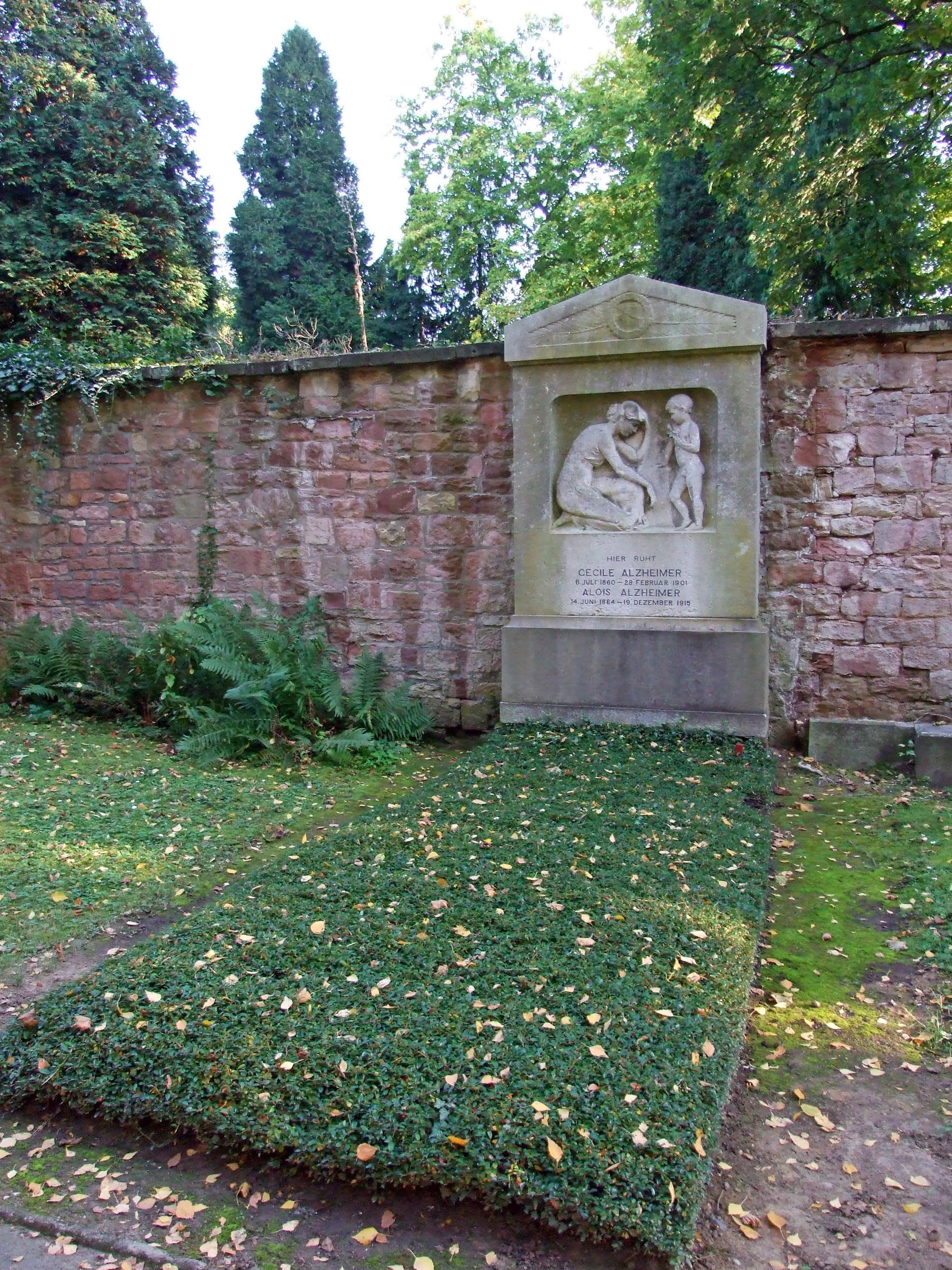
Grave of Alois Alzheimer

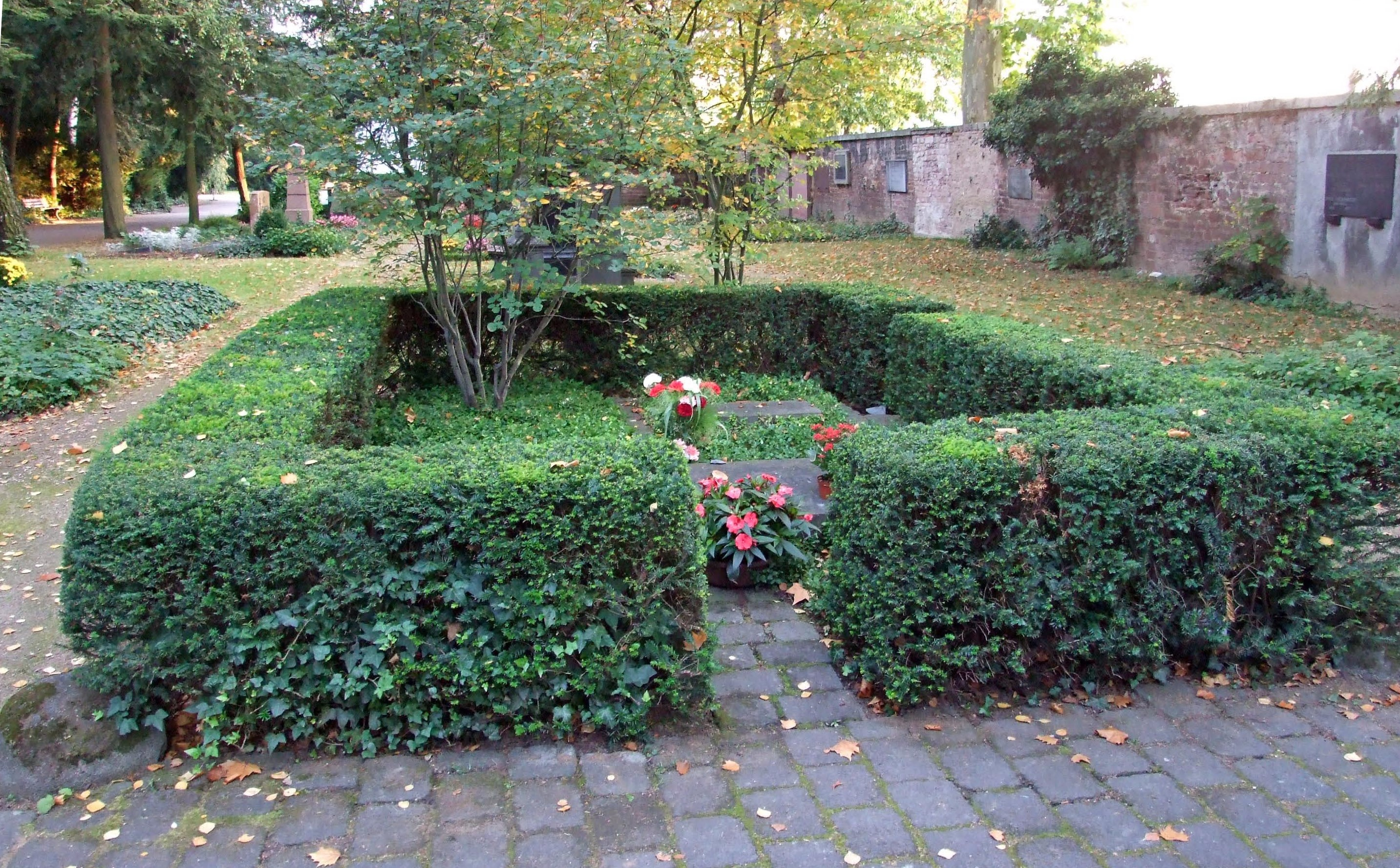
Grave of Arthur Schopenhauer

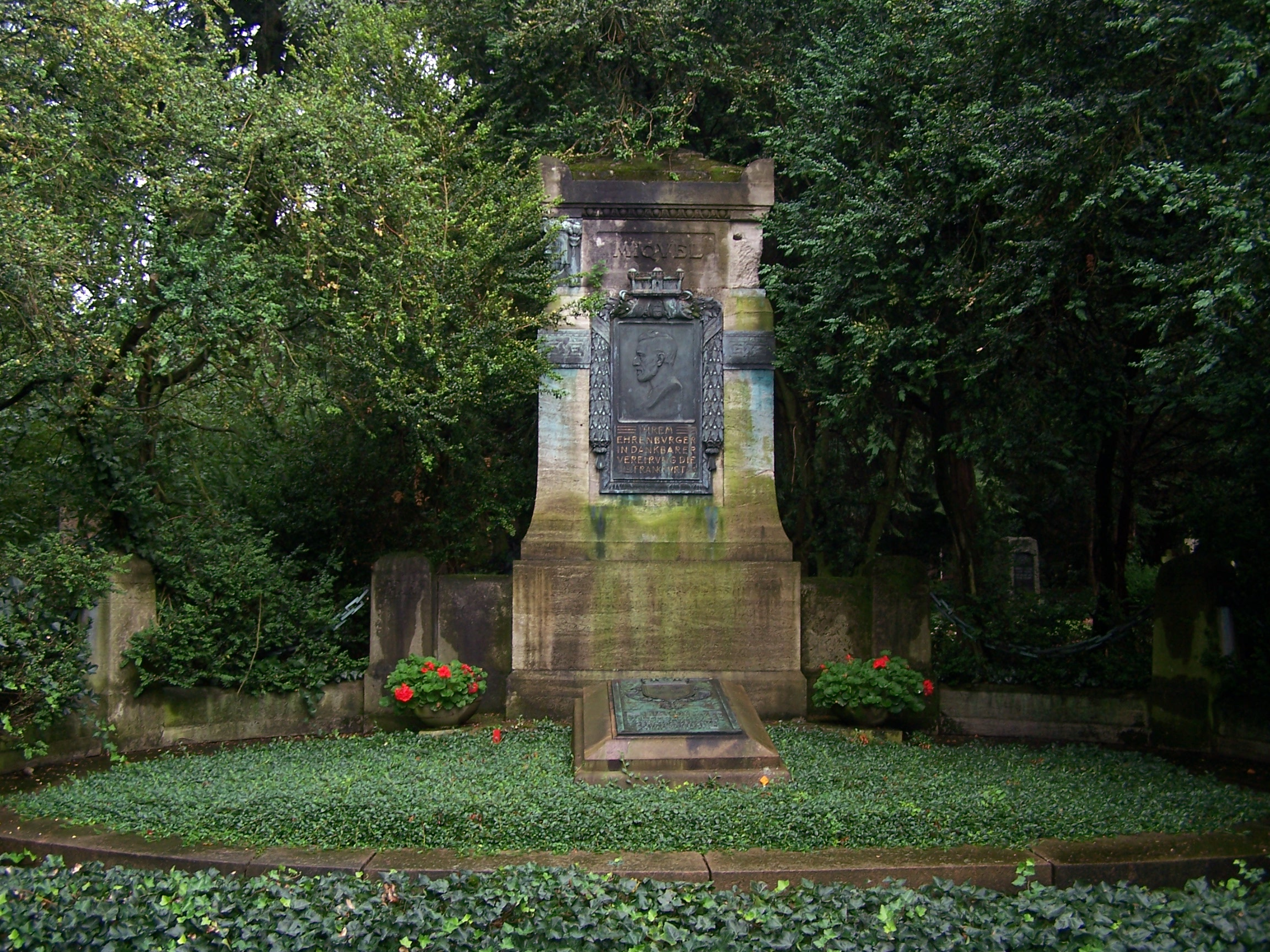
Grave of Johannes von Miquel

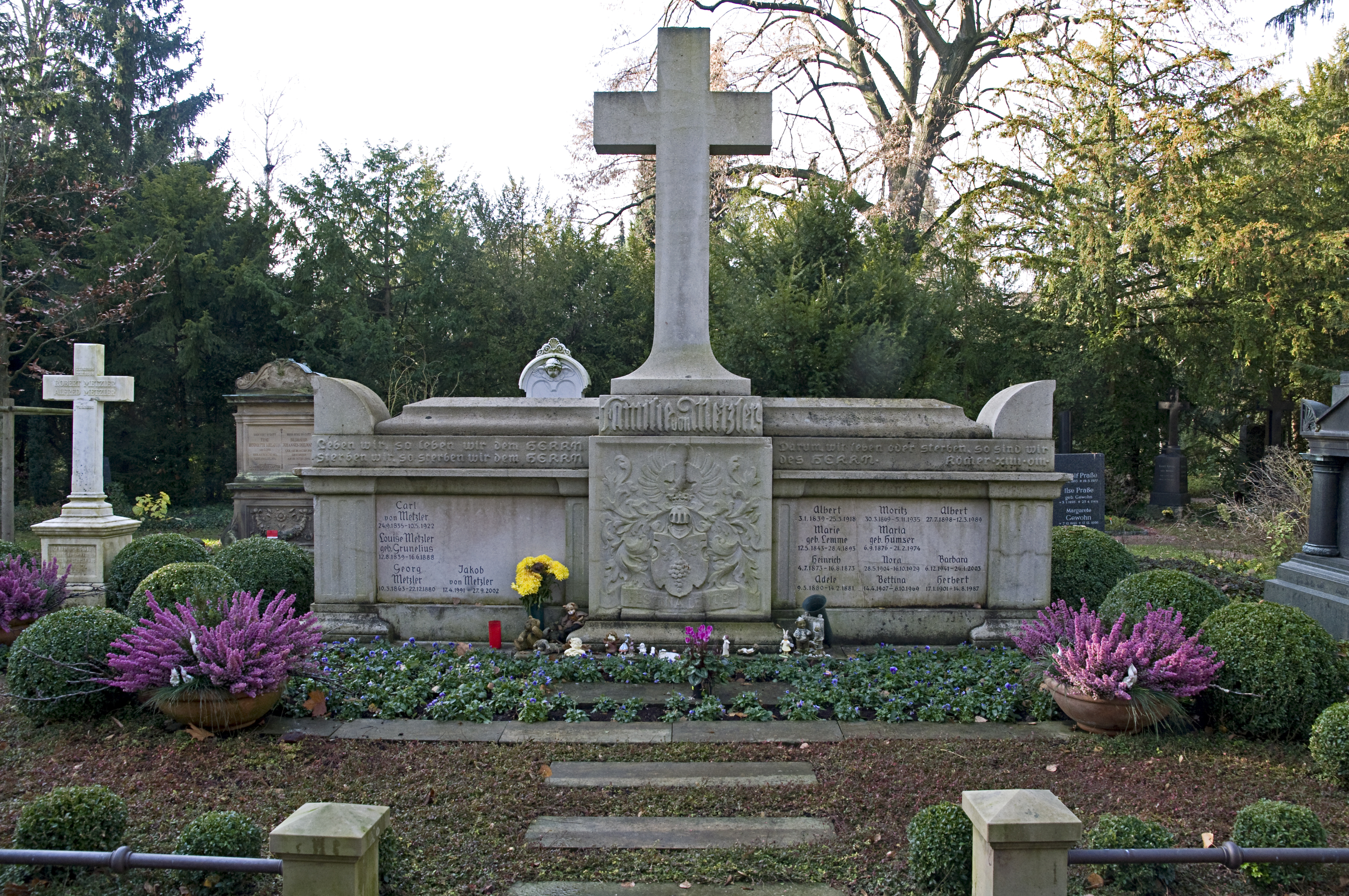
Grave of the Metzler banking family

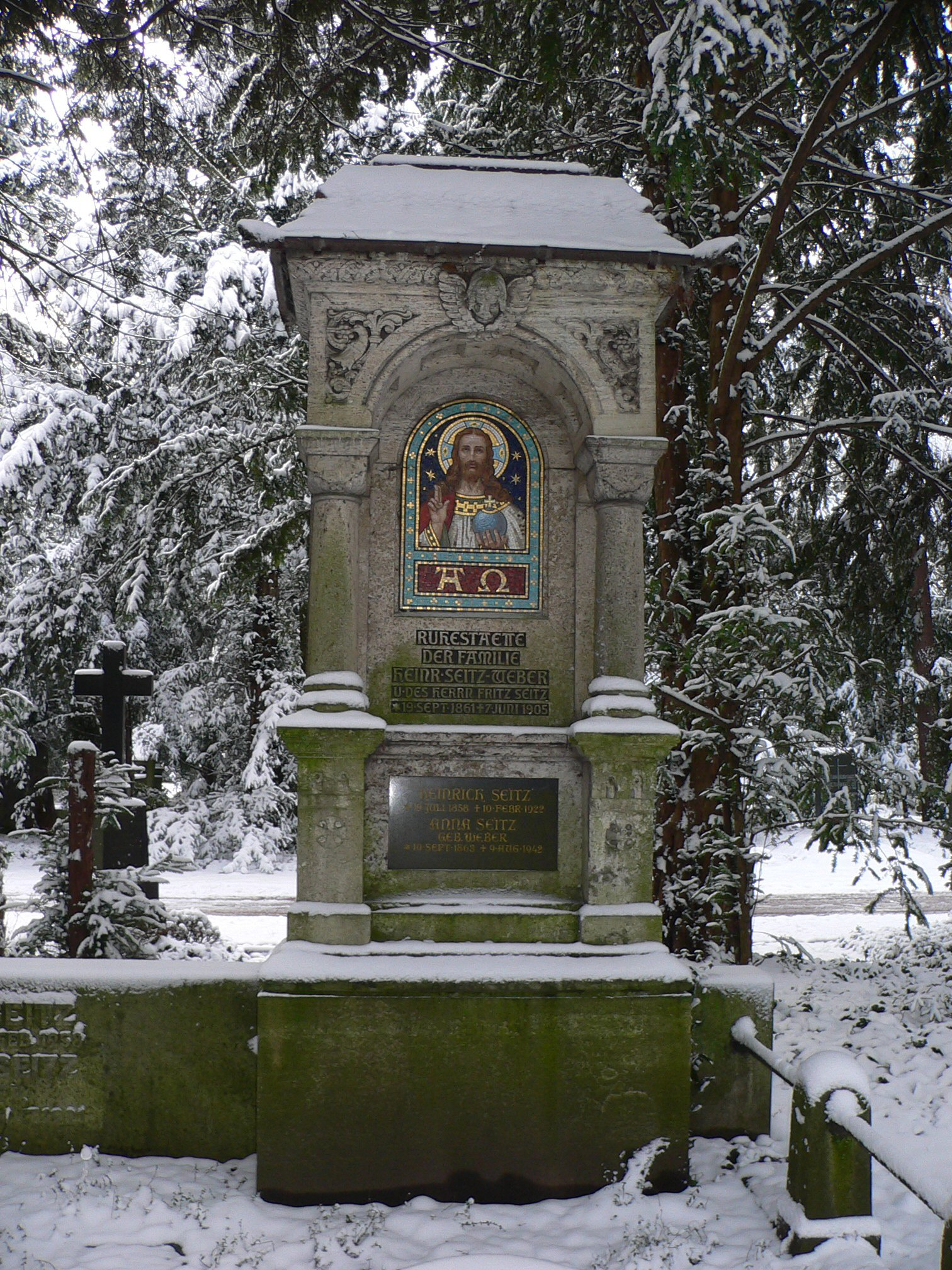
Grave of the Seitz family

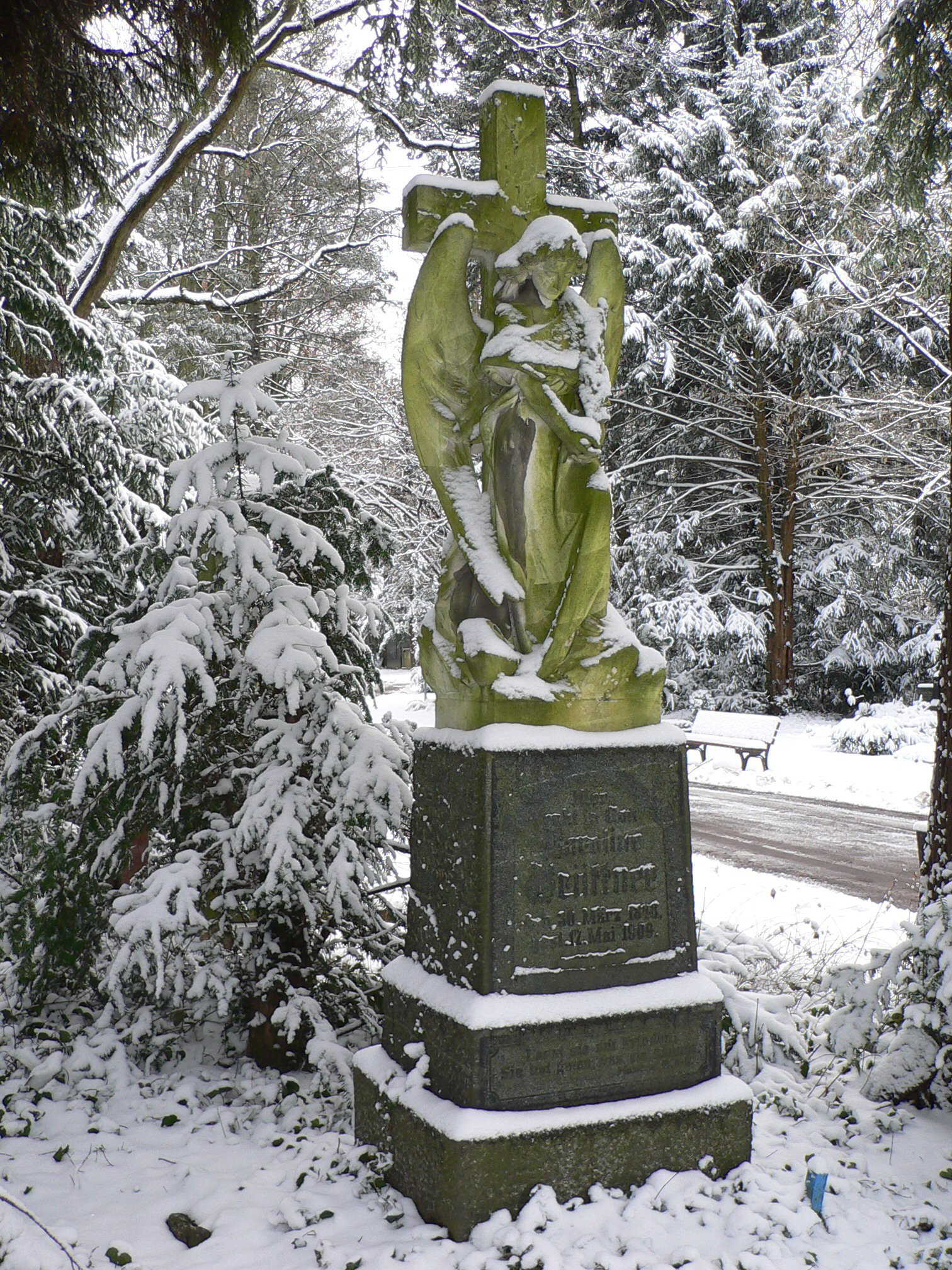
Grave of the Grüttner family

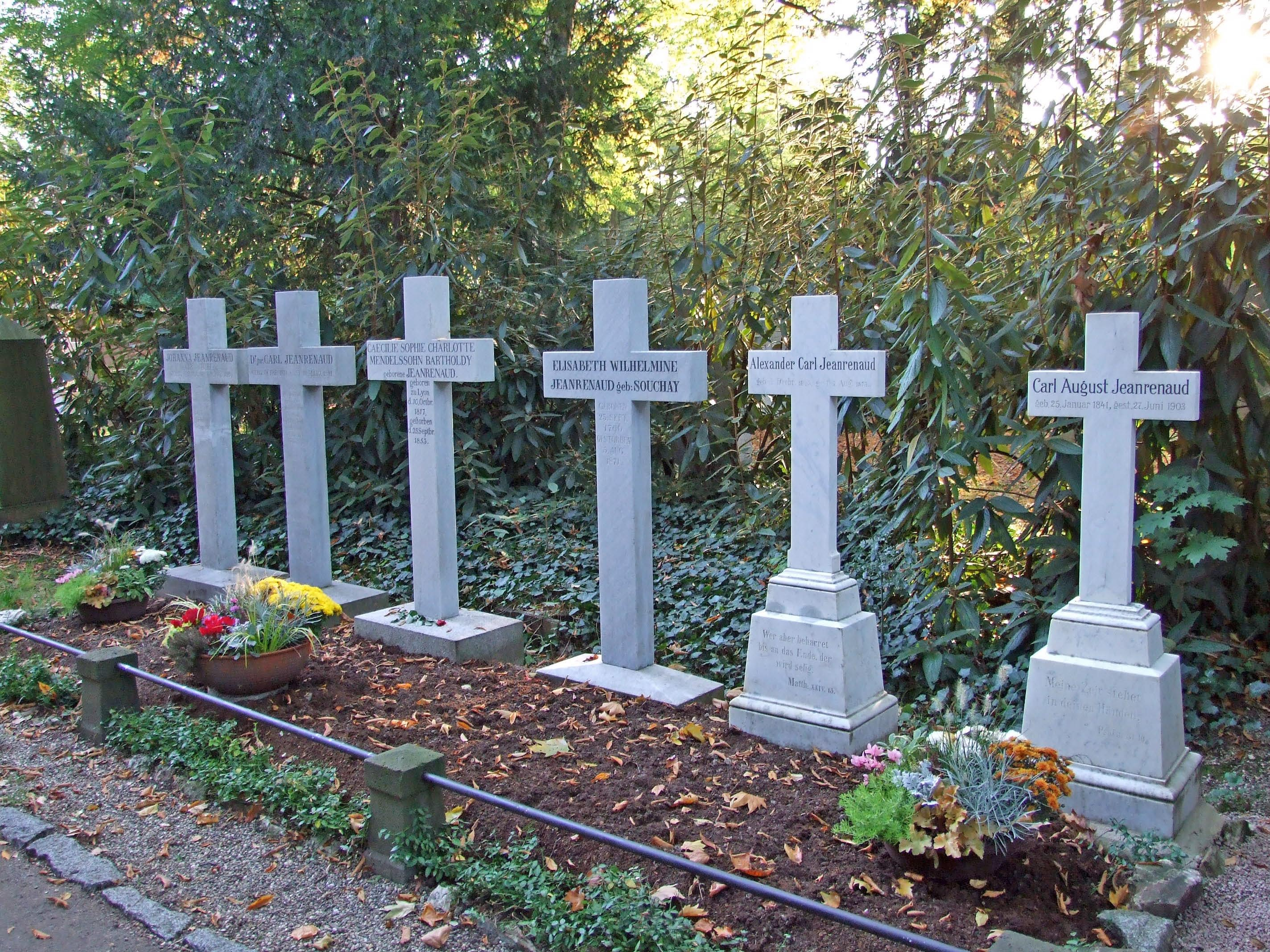
Cécile Charlotte Sophie Mendelssohn Bartholdy née Jeanrenaud, wife of Felix Mendelssohn, with other family members

The Frankfurt Main Cemetery (German: Hauptfriedhof) is the largest cemetery in Frankfurt am Main, Germany. It was opened in 1828. The cemetery is located directly adjacent to two Jewish cemeteries—the Old Jewish Cemetery (opened together with the Main Cemetery in 1828) and the New Jewish Cemetery, Frankfurt (opened in 1928)—and together they form one of the largest cemetery areas in Germany. The cemetery is noted for its many monumental graves, its garden architecture and as the site of the graves of many notable individuals.

== History ==
The Frankfurt Main Cemetery was planned as the replacement of St. Peter's Cemetery, which had been the main cemetery of the city since the 16th century. At the time, today's Main Cemetery was located outside of the city. The plans were met with resistance in the population. In particular, the still influential patrician families did not want to abandon their monumental family tombs at St. Peter's Cemetery. They only relented when larger monumental graves were also permitted on the new cemetery, contrary to the initial plan.

== Notable graves ==
The references are to the graves' locations (Gewann unless otherwise noted).

=== A ===
- Wolfgang Abendroth (1906–1985), jurist
- Wilhelm Heinrich Ackermann (1789–1848), educator
- Franz Adickes (1846–1915), Mayor of Frankfurt 1890–1912
- Justinian von Adlerflycht (1761–1831), jurist and politician
- Theodor W. Adorno (1903–1969), philosopher
- Wilhelm Altheim (1871–1914), painter
- Alois Alzheimer (1864–1915), physician
- Alois Ammerschläger (1913–1995), businessman
- Rudi Arndt (1927–2004), Mayor of Frankfurt 1972–1977
- Hans von Auerswald (1792–1848), General and politician, E243

=== B ===
- Bertha Bagge (1859–1939), painter, J 61
- Karl Ballenberger (1801–1860) painter, F 47
- Anne Bärenz (1950–2005), jazz musician V 774
- August de Bary (1874–1954), physician, D
- Albrecht Becker (1840–1911), architect, J 120
- Jakob Becker (1810–1872), painter, F 143
- Peter Becker (1828–1904), painter, F 1889
- Wilhelm Amandus Beer (1837–1907), painter C 260
- Johann Adam Beil (1790–1852), senator and founder of the cemetery, C7
- Maria Belli-Gontard (1788–1883), author, Gruft 43
- Matthias Beltz (1945–2002), musician, XIII GG48
- Willy Berking (1910–1979), composer, Gedenkstätte E an der Mauer 339a
- Family von Bethmann, bankers B an der Mauer 362 + 400
- Ernst Beutler (1885–1960), literature, scholar, C214a
- Conrad Binding (1846–1933), founder of the Binding-Brauerei, F 816–817
- Friedrich Landolin Karl Freiherr von Blittersdorf (1792–1861), Baden politician and diplomat, an der Mauer 106
- Jakob Hermann Bockenheimer (1837–1908), surgeon, E an der Mauer 539a
- Fritz Boehle (1873–1916), painter and sculptor, X II 1
- Johann Friedrich Böhmer (1795–1863), historian, A 239
- Family Bolongaro, businessmen, an der Mauer 432
- Friedrich Bothe (1869–1952), historian, IV 171
- Rudolf Christian Böttger (1806–1881), chemist, J 751a
- Otto Brenner (1907–1972), sindicalist, E 1479b
- Antonie Brentano (1780–1869) and spouse Franz Brentano (1765–1844), merchant, Gruft 48
- Willi Brundert (1912–1970), Mayor of Frankfurt 1964–1970, II 204a
- Adolf von Brüning (1837–1884), founder of Hoechst AG, J an der Mauer 606–609
- Margarete Buber-Neumann (1901–1989), publisher, F 1908
- Carl Peter Burnitz (1824–1886), painter, E 724
- Rudolf Burnitz (1789–1849), architect, An der Mauer 516
- Rudolf Heinrich Burnitz (1827–1880), architect, An der Mauer 516

=== C–D ===
- Liesel Christ (1919–1996), actress, J 296
- Emil Claar (1847–1930), theatre director, I 183
- Hermine Claar-Delia (1848–1908), actress, I 183
- Philipp Otto Cornil (1824–1907), painter and art historian, D 12
- Sophie Cossaeus (1893–1965), actress, F 1459
- Philipp Jakob Cretzschmar (1786–1845), physician and founder of the Senckenberg Gesellschaft für Naturforschung, D 244/45
- Hermann Dechent (1850–1935), priest, A 282
- Franz Karl Delavilla (1884–1967), graphic artist, I 1354
- Jakob Fürchtegott Dielmann (1809–1885), painter, J 548
- Fritz Dietz (1909–1984), merchant, an der Mauer 410a

=== E–F ===
- Ludwig Edinger (1855–1918), physician, II GG 21
- Anna Edinger (1863–1929), women's rights activist, II GG 21
- Tilly Edinger (1897–1967), paleontologist, II GG 21
- August Euler (1868–1957), minister of aviation, IV 120
- Louis Eysen (1843–1899), painter, an der Mauer 555a
- Christian Wilhelm von Faber du Faur (1780–1857), jurist, General and military painter, D 86
- Karl Konstanz Viktor Fellner (1817–1866), Mayor of Frankfurt, D an der Mauer 164
- Anselm von Feuerbach (1775–1833), jurist, C an der Mauer 105
- Johann Karl von Fichard (1773–1829), historian, C a.d.Mauer 79
- Karl Flesch (1853–1915), politician E 47a
- Berthold Freudenthal (1873–1929), jurist V 74a
- Leo Frobenius (1873–1938), Africa researcher, C 424

=== G–H ===
- Mausoleum Gans, built 1909 for Friedrich Ludwig von Gans IV
- Leo Gans (1843–1935), businessman, III GG 9
- Else Gentner-Fischer (1883–1943), opera singer, II 34
- Robert Gernhardt (1937–2006), author, A 1103
- Hermann Goepfert(1926–1982), painter, XIII 361
- Georg Goltermann (1824–1898), composer, D an der Mauer 153
- Familie Gontard, B Gruft 44
- Karl Graebe (1841–1927), chemist, D 75
- Günther Groenhoff (1908–1932), XIV 219b
- Georg Friedrich von Guaita (1772–1851), Mayor of Frankfurt, C 8
- Karl Gutzkow (1811–1878), author, D 272a
- Philipp Friedrich Gwinner (1796–1868), Mayor of Frankfurt, B an der Mauer 399
- Adolf Haeuser (1857–1938), industrialist, II 192
- Ferdinand Happ (1868–1952), poet, A 159a
- Eduard Ludwig von Harnier (1800–1868), Mayor of Frankfurt, E an der Mauer 359a
- Georg Hartmann (1870–1954), businessman, II 34
- Hans Hartz (1943–2002), songwriter, XIV 9
- Samuel Friedrich Hassel (1798–1876), singer and actor, A 24
- Heinrich Hasselhorst (1825–1904), painter, F 1820
- Eva Heller (1948–2008), author
- Philipp Helfmann (1843–1909), businessman, E 774
- Johann Friedrich Christian Hess (1785–1845), architect, D 457
- Friedrich Hessemer (1800–1860), architect, F II
- Kurt Hessenberg (1908–1994), composer G 540
- Karl Heussenstamm (1835–1913), Mayor of Frankfurt, G 428
- Carl Heinrich Georg von Heyden (1793–1866), Mayor of Frankfurt, D 216 an der Mauer
- Wilhelm Hill (1838–1902), composer, E 131
- Joseph Hoch (1815–1874), lawyer and founder of the Hoch Conservatory, Gruft 39
- Heinrich Hoffmann (1809–1894), author (Struwwelpeter), G an der Mauer 541
- Wilhelm Hollbach (1893–1962), Mayor of Frankfurt, I 1118
- Adolph von Holzhausen (1866–1923), F an der Mauer 184
- Anton Ulrich von Holzhausen (1754–1832), Mayor of Frankfurt, F an der Mauer 137
- Heinrich Holzmann (1879–1962), businessman, II GG3
- Johann Philipp Holzmann (1805–1870), businessman, F 568
- Arthur Hübscher (1897–1985), author and chairman of the Schopenhauer Society, A 24a (next to Arthur Schopenhauer)
- Ricarda Huch (1864–1947), author, II 204
- Wilhelm Friedrich Hufnagel (1754–1830), theologian, C Reihe 12/37

=== I–L ===
- Johannes Janssen (1829–1891), historian, E 562
- Wilhelm Jordan (1819–1904), author, F 946
- Rudolf Jung (1859–1922), historian, G 1500
- Heinz-Herbert Karry (1920–1981), politician, XIV 202
- Anton Kirchner (1779–1835), historian, D 60
- Johanna Kirchner (1889–1944), political activist, I 242
- Heinrich Kleyer (1853–1932), businessman, II 191
- Ferdinand Karl Klimsch (1812–1890), painter, V 428
- Karl Ferdinand Klimsch (1841–1926), painter, V 428
- Walter Kolb (1902–1956), Mayor of Frankfurt A 55a
- Friedrich Krebs (1894–1961), Mayor of Frankfurt, XII 646
- Georg Ludwig Kriegk (1805–1878), historian, E 93
- Armin K.W. Kutzsche (1914–1995), physician, C
- Ludwig Landmann (1868–1945), Mayor of Frankfurt, A 290
- Jakob Latscha (1849–1912), businessman, J 463a
- Familie Julius Lejeune, B 106
- Theodor Lerner (1866–1931), journalist, A 47
- Felix Maria Vincenz Andreas Fürst von Lichnowsky (1814–1848), politician, E 243 (memorial)
- Bruno Liebrucks (1911–1986), philosopher, IV 207
- Alexander Linnemann (1839–1902), architect, F 1356
- Rose Livingston (1860–1914), philanthropist, F an der Mauer 460b
- Eugen Lucius (1834–1903), chemist, F 2046, 2047
- Carl Luley (1887–1966), actor, XIII 618

=== M–N ===
- Erwin Madelung (1881–1972), physicist, A 609
- Charlotte Mahler (1894–1973), surgeon, II GG 31
- Ernst Majer-Leonhard (1889–1966), school leader, E
- Carl Malß (1792–1848), poet, A Reihe 94/98
- Albert Mangelsdorff (1928–2005), jazz musician, XV 31
- Friedrich Nicolas Manskopf (1869–1928), wine merchant, D 294
- Edwin von Manteuffel (1809–1885), General, Altes Portal (memorial)
- Ernst May (1886–1970), architect, A 274
- Carl Friedrich Wilhelm Meister (1827–1895), industrialist, an der Mauer 450
- Cécile Charlotte Sophie Mendelssohn Bartholdy née Jeanrenaud (1817–1851), wife of Felix Mendelssohn Bartholdy, E 172
- Richard Merton (1881–1960), industrialist and philanthropist, II GG 10, 11
- Wilhelm Merton (1848–1916), Industrialist, II GG 10,11
- Albert von Metzler (1839–1918), banker, C 88
- Johann Friedrich von Meyer (1772–1849), senator, an der Mauer D 176
- Johannes von Miquel (1828–1901), Mayor of Frankfurt, D 297
- Alexander Mitscherlich (1908–1982), author, J 1049
- Margarete Mitscherlich (1917–2012), physician, J 1049
- Franz Joseph Molitor (1779–1860), author, F 250
- Walter Möller (1920–1971), Mayor of Frankfurt, II 202c
- Tycho Mommsen (1819–1900), philologist, F 1608
- Carl Morgenstern (1811–1893), painter F 864
- Johann Friedrich Morgenstern (1777–1844), painter, A 101
- Johann Georg Mouson (1812–1894), businessman, V 163
- Victor Müller (1830–1871), painter, an der Mauer 542a
- Daniel Heinrich Mumm von Schwarzenstein (1818–1890), Mayor of Frankfurt, A 84
- Ernst Franz August Münzenberger (1833–1890), art collector, B 141
- Carl Friedrich Mylius (1827–1916), photographer, C Gruft 24
- Karl Jonas Mylius (1839–1883), architect, C Gruft 24
- Josef Neckermann (1912–1992), B an der Mauer 380–81
- Christian Ernst Neeff (1782–1849), physician, an der Mauer 62
- Ludwig von Neher (1850–1916), architect, II GG 69
- Peter von Oubril (1774–1848), Russian diplomat, Gruft 13

=== P–R ===
- Alfons Paquet (1881–1944), journalist, A 276a
- Marie Paquet-Steinhausen (1881–1958), painter A 276a
- Johann David Passavant (1787–1861), art historian F 589
- Theodor Petersen (1836–1918), chemist, A 61
- Camille Armand Jules Marie, Prince de Polignac (1832–1913), French Nobleman, Last surviving Confederate Major General, French Brigadier General, Chevalier of the Legion d'honneur, C Gruft 30
- Max Quarck (1860–1930), politician, E 743
- Meta Quarck-Hammerschlag (1864–1954), politician, E 743
- Joseph Joachim Raff (1822–1882), Swiss composer, D 298
- Ludwig Rehn (1849–1930), surgeon, V 143
- Marcel Reich-Ranicki (1920–2013), literature critic, XIV 34 UG
- Teofila Reich-Ranicki (1920–2011), artist, XIV 34 UG
- Countess Emilie von Reichenbach-Lessonitz née Ortlepp (1791–1843), wife of the Elector of Hesse, Mausoleum, F 1
- Carl Theodor Reiffenstein (1820–1893), painter, G 372
- Ferdinand Ries (1784–1837), composer and student of Beethoven
- Sebastian Rinz (1782–1861), C 155
- Friedrich Roessler (1813–1883), an der Mauer 444
- Ludwig Rottenberg (1864–1932), composer, II GG29
- Friedrich Rumpf (1795–1867), architect, an der Mauer 269a
- Eduard Rüppell (1794–1884), African researcher, F 155a

=== S ===
- Gottfried Scharff (1782–1855), merchant and Mayor of Frankfurt, B an der Mauer 330
- Friedrich Schierholz (1840–1894), sculptor, J 634 Plan Nr.158
- Adolf Schindling (1887–1963), senator, III
- Dorothea Schlegel née Mendelssohn (1763–1839), author, B 180
- Matthias Jacob Schleiden (1804–1881), botanist, J 751b
- Peter Schmick (1833–1899), architect, an der Mauer 465a
- Johann Friedrich Moritz Schmidt-Metzler (1838–1907), physician, C 90
- Pauline Schmidt (1840–1856), C 148
- Eduard Schmidt von der Launitz (1797–1869), sculptor, an der Mauer 398a
- Victor Schmieden (1874–1945), surgeon XIV 33
- Otto Scholderer (1834–1902), painter F 185a
- Arthur Moritz Schoenflies (1853–1928), XIV 403
- Arthur Schopenhauer (1788–1860), philosopher, A 24
- Norbert Schrödl (1842–1912), painter, I 531
- Samuel Thomas von Soemmerring (1755–1830), anatomist, an der Mauer 178
- Elisabeth Schwarzhaupt (1901–1986), politician, II 268
- Johann Baptist von Schweitzer (1833–1875), politician, Gruft 32
- Hermann Senf (1878–1979), architect, VII 231a
- Lutz Sikorski (1950–2011), politician, D 550
- Albert Steigenberger (1889–1958), IV 125
- Wilhelm Steinhausen (1846–1924), painter, E 577a
- David Stempel (1869–1927), II 220
- Adolf Stoltze (1842–1933), poet, II GG 23
- Friedrich Stoltze (1816–1891), journalist, J 306,
- Ignatz Stroof (1838–1920), chemist, I 212
- Carl-Heinrich von Stülpnagel (1886–1944), General, an der Mauer 402b (memorial)

=== T–Z ===
- Alfred Teves and family, businessman, II 135
- Gustav Treupel (1867–1926), physician, V
- Abisag Tüllmann (1935–1996), photographer, F 1763
- Siegfried Unseld (1924–2002), publisher, II 203
- Franz Volhard (1872–1950), physician, V 311
- Friedrich Karl Waechter (1937–2005), cartoonist, J 1066
- Walter Wallmann (1932–2013), Mayor of Frankfurt, XIV, 32
- Beda Weber (1798–1858), German Benedictine professor, author, and member of the Frankfurt Parliament, B 141, 142
- Arthur von Weinberg (1860–1943), businessman, II GG 29, 29a, 30
- Marianne von Willemer (1784–1860), Goethe's love interest, D 261
- Franz Xaver Winterhalter (1805–1873), painter, C 123/124
- Johann Georg August Wirth (1798–1848), author, A 98–88
- Paul Wolff (1887–1951), physician, II GG 17a
- Julius Ziehen (1864–1925), educator D 228
- Johann Nepomuk Zwerger (1796–1868), sculptor D 256
- Caroline Valentin (1855–1923), musicologist
