= Uhrtürmchen =

Clock tower monument in Frankfurt

Coordinates: 50°06′57″N 8°41′44″E

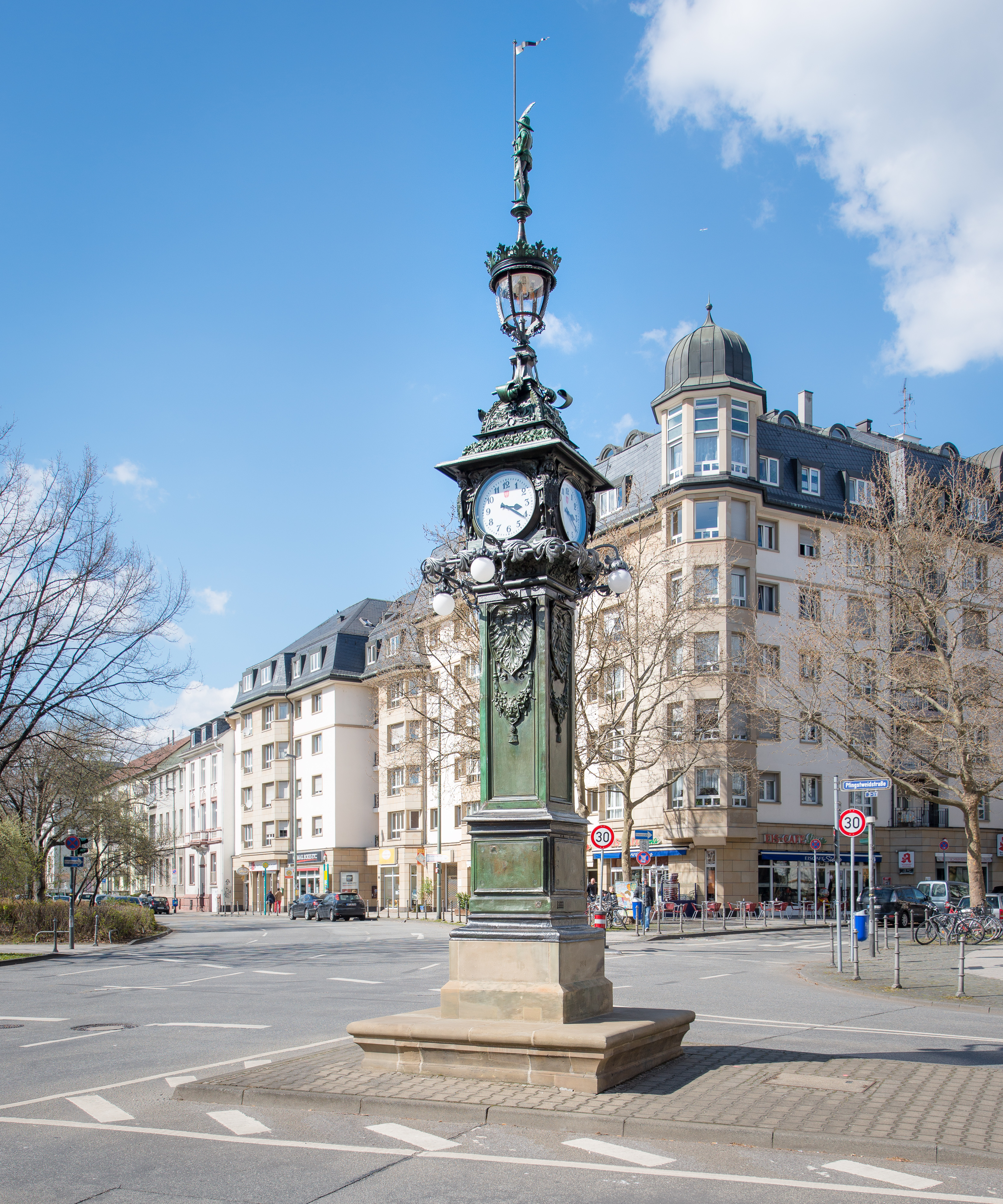
Uhrtürmchen at the end of Zeil following restoration.

Uhrtürmchen (lit. 'clock turret') is a protected monument in Frankfurt am Main, Germany, located at the corner of Friedberger Anlage near the Zoo. It is one of only two remaining clock towers in the city, the other being located in Bornheim, and is the oldest surviving one, having been first erected in the 19th century. Today the tower serves as a popular tourist attraction, as well as a meeting point for people in the city.

The clock was designed by architect Alexander Linnemann and endowed in 1894 by the former Ostend-Verein, an organisation consisting of tradespeople, in a primarily Jewish part of the city at the time. Following the removal of many other former clock towers at locations like Kaiserstraße and Opernplatz, this then became the tallest and most decorated clock tower left in the city. The tower survived the destruction of the city during the Second World War but fell into a poor condition over time. During the 2010s, a campaign to finance the restoration of the clock tower began, supported primarily by the city cultural department and a local organisation called Freunde Frankfurts (friends of Frankfurt). The restoration of the clock cost approximately €150,000, of which €25,000 came from the cultural department, €15,000 from the municipal council for said district, €20,000 from an anonymous donor, and €90,000 from fundraising efforts from the Freunde Frankfurts.

After being deconstructed and restored in Thuringia, the clock was returned and officially inaugurated before a crowd on 26 March 2015. The original design has been maintained, which shows the base of the nine-metre high tower covered in sheet metal and adorned with coats of arms. On top of the clock base itself is a street lantern with a crown atop, upon which a knight holding a flag extended vertically stands. A few years later, citizens also began to push for the smaller clock tower in Bornheim to be cleaned up and cleared of graffitied articles, which was completed in 2019 by the local waste management authority.
