= Meta Quarck-Hammerschlag =

German social reformer and activist (1864–1954)

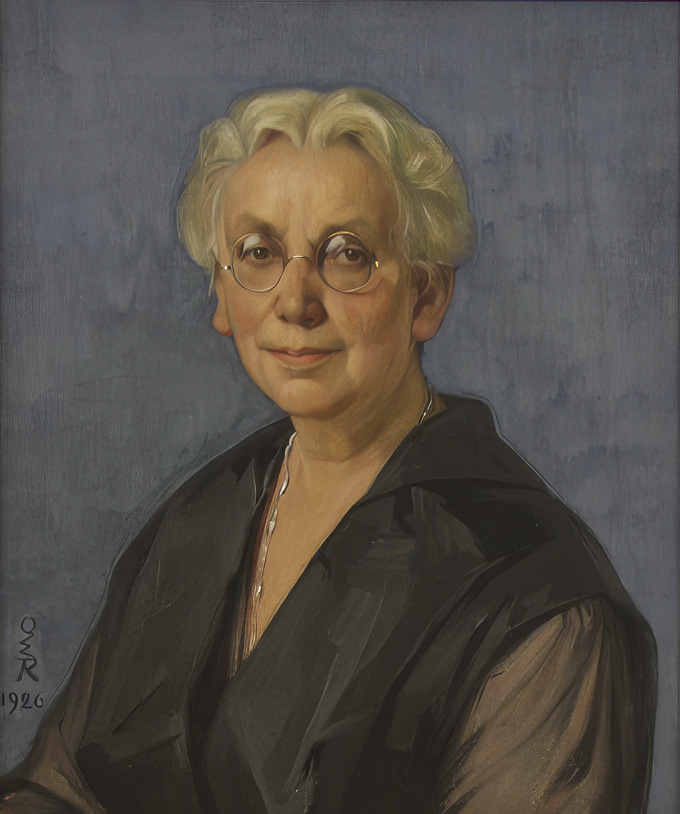
- Painting by Ottilie Roederstein, 1926
- Born: Meta Heinrichs; 21 December 1864; Höchst am Main, Duchy of Nassau
- Died: 11 August 1954 (aged 89); Frankfurt am Main, Hessen, West Germany
- Occupations: Social policy reformer Women's rights activist
- Known for: she was the first woman to serve as a member of the Frankfurt city council ("Magistrat")
- Political party: SPD
- Spouses: Wilhelm Hammerschlag (1853–1889); Max Quarck (1860–1930)
- Children: Luise Ernestine "Liesel" Hammerschlag / Ruberl (1886–1974)
- Parents: Chrysostomos Wilhelm Heinrichs (1836–1908) (father); Maria Sophia Luise Saurmann (1842–1932) (mother)

Meta Quarck-Hammerschlag (born Meta Heinrichs: 21 December 1864 – 11 August 1954) was a German social reformer and women's rights activist. She had a number of 'firsts' to her name: she was the first woman to serve as a member of the Frankfurt city council ("Magistrat"), which she did between 1919 and 1924 and again between 1926 and 1933. Through that period the focus of her work remained, as before, on welfare issues and youth work.

== Life ==
=== Provenance and early years ===
Meta Heinrichs was born, as she would later put it, "in a small apartment belonging to the local 'Arbeiterwohlfahrt' (workers' welfare association)", alongside the main street connecting the little towns (as they were at the time) of Höchst and Nied, a short distance to the west of the city of Frankfurt am Main (into which the entire area has subsequently been incorporated). She was still very small when the family relocated, to the Dalberger House, a substantial residence directly opposite the historic castle-palace in nearby Höchst. The Dalberger House came with a long history and with its own large plot of land, on which her father found the space to establish a business manufacturing and marketing gelatine for the fast growing photographic and pharmaceutical industries. (Note: Although Dalberger House has survived, and is indeed mared out by a commemorative plaque to Meta Quarck-Hammerschlag prominently positioned on an outer wall, the large piece of adjacent land on which Heinrichs would site his factory now accommodates an indoor swomming pool for the use of employees at the vast Hoechst AG (since 1999 renamed "Aventis Deutschland") chemicals plant.) Meta was the eldest of her parents' five recorded children – all girls. Her father, Chrysostomos Wilhelm Heinrichs (1836–1908), was a successful entrepreneur-manufacturer who during her childhood was becoming wealthy. Her mother, born Maria Sophia Luise Saurmann (1842–1932), came from a well-established local family. The Dalberger House in which Meta grew up with her family was located in the old heart of Höchst, which was expanding rapidly at the time, and where she attended primary school till 1874. There was no secondary school that accepted girls in Höchst, so she transferred to the prestigious "Elisabethenschule", an all-girls secondary school on the north side of Frankfurt itself. Unusually for school girls at that time, between 1874 and 1880 she commuted to and from school each day by train. The family home was comfortable, while the family was in some ways non-conformist. Her parents encouraged her love of reading. The Heinrichs, her father's ancestors had been among the first to declare their support for the French Revolution, and had lived through the short-lived Mainz Republic in 1793. It was, perhaps, no more than the result of an inherited family trait that Meta Heinrichs would always cultivate a certain resolute eccentricity. After she grew up and became politically involved she smoked a pipe and cigars, "not because she liked it, but to make a point". Those who knew her were also struck by the extent to which she loved to talk, and was general successful in avoiding being interrupted.

After successfully completing her schooling, Heinrichs spent a year in Belgium during 1879–80.

=== First marriage ===
Meta Heinrichs married the chemist, Wilhelm Hammerschlag (1853–1889), while she was still, by the standards of her social class at that time, relatively young, probably in 1885. The couple made their new home together at Elberfeld in the industrialising region surrounding Wuppertal. Her husband was employed nearby at the research centre of the dye-stuffs company known at that time as "Farbenfabriken vorm. Friedrich Bayer & Co". The couple's daughter, Luise Ernestine (1886–1974), was born at Elberfeld on 26 April 1886. In 1887, she returned to the Frankfurt region with her husband and child when Wilhelm Hammerschlag became co-owner of "Friedrich Weisbrod & Co.", a company manufacturing photographic dry plates (which were manufactured using gelatin emulsions such as those produced by Wilhelm Heinrichs, Meta's father). The sudden death, following a heart attack, of Wilhelm Hammerschlag on 24 January 1889 left Meta, still aged just 24, unexpectedly widowed. Unlike many single parents she was nevertheless financially independent and, at this stage, secure. Nevertheless, she had become by definition more of an outsider than before. At that time, in the words of one commentator, "being a single parent in the middle class family milieu was less than ideal".

=== Creative widowhood ===
Despite eventually remarrying, Meta Hammerschlag would continue to use her first husband's surname till she died, nearly seventy years later: widowhood nevertheless opened up certain opportunities. She launched herself as a social activist. In 1892 she was an early member, and according to at least one source a co-founder, of the "Frankfurter Hauspflegeverein" ("Frankfurt Home-care Association"), which provided families in which the housewife-mother was out of action due to childbirth or illness with the services of a qualified home carer. One source states that she acted in this way because she was influenced by her father's social commitment, while another states that she was probably motivated through becoming aware of the hardships endured by her father's factory workers: the two interpretations are not necessarily mutually exclusive.

In the aftermath of her husband's death she returned to living with her parents, for whom 1892 was also a year of changes. Her father was involved in a merger between the gelatine factory he had built up beside his home with a complementary business in Frankfurt, following which the Heinrichs relocated again, this time to a large "Gründerzeit" villa along the Röderbergweg in east-central Frankfurt. Her father, who had now become a wealthy man of leisure but also if considerable energy, involved himself closely in his eldest daughter's welfare work. The relationship was evidently a collaborative one. The new family home had a gardener's/gatekeeper's lodge which Meta repurposed as an office. Her commitment to liberating women and women's voting rights was as intense as her commitment to social justice: she used her office for both causes, setting up a little teaching agency. She was a passionate advocate for girls' education, which at a time when mainstream education reformers were generally interested only in educating boys. Meta Hammerschlag promoted the causes in which she believed. Beyond personal commitment she was also able to back her beliefs with money. Among the causes she backed there was a common theme: "She felt the necessity for socially disadvantaged people to obtain qualifications".

The 1890s were a period during which women – generally from the haute-bourgeoisie – across Germany were forming organisations to energise a range of causes including those as those which concerned Meta Hammerschlag. In 1894 she became a member of the "Frankfurter Frauenbildungsverein" ("... women's education association"). The next year she joined the Frankfurt branch of the newly founded "Allgemeiner Deutscher Frauenverein" ("... general women's association"). In 1898 she accepted the chairmanship of the Frankfurt branch of "Frauenbildung–Frauenstudium" (devoted to women's education issues). The next year she co-founded a Frankfurt section of the "Frankfurter Vereine für Armenpflege und Wohltätigkeit" ("... association for poverty relief and welfare action").

=== Karlsruhe ===
In 1899 Meta Hammerschlag relocated with her daughter to Karlsruhe in Baden. Her daughter Luise Ernestine ("Liesel") was about to become a teenager, and as long as she remained in Frankfurt would be prevented from sitting the Abitur exam on account of her gender. The Abitur was important because, under normal circumstances, it opened the way to university-level education. By moving away from Frankfurt Hammerschlag made it possible – at least in theory – for her daughter to qualify for admission as a student – or at least as a "guest attendee" at lectures – at Heidelberg University. Between 1899 and 1907, living in Karlsruhe, Meta Hemmaerslag was able to focus on her daughter's education. During 1904 Liesel Hammerslag sat for and passed her Abitur. During 1905 she embarked on a course at Heidelberg in Philology and Art History which according to one source led to her obtaining a doctorate by the time of her marriage, which took place in 1909.

In 1905 Mother and daughter took a lengthy trip to Italy. It was one of a number of visits to Italy – possibly in connection with Liesel's study of art history – while the two of them were living in Karlsruhe. A few years later, in 1909, when Liesel Hammerschlag married Heinrich Ruberl, an engineer, the event was solemnised in Florence, to be followed in due course by the births of Liesel Hammerschlag/Ruberl's children, Meta Hammerschlag's three grandsons.

=== Return to Frankfurt ===
During the summer of 1907 Meta Hammerschlag returned to Frankfurt, where initially she moved in with the family of her youngest sister, Leonore "Leno" Homberger (1880–1938), who had married a cardiologist. She had evidently never severed her links with the "Frankfurter Hauspflegeverein", in which her sister was also actively involved, and other welfare organisations with which she had engaged eight years before, and now had no difficulty in resuming her sociopolitical activism. A year later, on 15 June 1908, her father died. Her mother continued to live in the east-end family villa along the Röderbergweg. Meta's mother took over the administration of her late husband's remaining business interests, and Meta herself moved in to share the family home with her mother.

Through the "Frankfurter Hauspflegeverein" she became involved in the committee with organisational responsibilities in respect of the Gellertstraße widowers home that had been opened in 1905 on the north side of the city. After 1909, when the home was transferred to a specialist housing association mandated to replace the home for s block of small apartments to accommodate fathers whose wives had died and their children, she remained engaged in the project, chairing its executive committee. Between 1907 and 1911 she also chaired the "Verband Fortschrittlicher Frauenvereine" ("League of progressive [i.e. relatively left-wing] Women's Associations"), which meant she became, in 1907, a member of the executive committee of the nationwide "Bund Deutscher Frauenvereine" ("Federation of German Women's Associations").

Also in 1907 Hammerschlag was a co-founder of the Frankfurt branch of the "League for the Maternity Protection" ("Bund für Mutterschutz"), becoming a member of the executive committee overseeing league activities in the Frankfurt region. The league was committed to improving the condition and status of mothers in legal, economic and social terms. She was also highly active for many years at the start of the century in the International Abolitionist Movement which, in the context of Germany at the time, had little to do with the legacies of Anglo-American slavery, but was a widespread campaigning to put an end to the criminalisation of prostitution. At or shortly before the beginning of 1908 she took on the chair of the Frankfurt branch association, also being a member representing Germany in the International Abolitionist Federation. Members called for the perceived increase in prostitution to be addressed not with criminal law solutions, but by improved welfare and medical support for the women involved. There were many changes in Meta Hammerslag's life over the next couple of decades, but membership of the International Abolitionist Federation was one role that she would retain till 1928. In 1909 she became the first chairwoman of the newly established "League for the Support and Care of the Poor and of Orphans" ("Verband zur Förderung der Armen- und Waisenpflege") of which, according to some sources, she had also been a co-founder.

Between 1909 and 1912 she chaired the "Frankfurt League for Women's Voting Rights" ("... Verein für Frauenstimmrecht"). At the same time, between 1910 and 1912 Meta Hammerschlag chaired the Hessen-Nassau Provincial Association for Women's Voting Rights, alongside which she was a member of the extended executive committee of the "Prussian State Association" for "Women's Voting Rights". (Frankfurt and most of the surrounding region, including the Duchy of Nassau, had been incorporated into the Kingdom of Prussia in 1866.) She was one of three co-publisher-producers of the short-lived monthly journal "Frauen-Zukunft" ("Women's Future"). (Note: The other two women behind "Frauen-Zukunft", which appeared between 1910 and (probably) 1912, were Hanns Dorn and Gabriele von Liebe.)

In September 1910, reflecting her growing public profile in respect of the issues, she was elected to membership of the city's "Armen- und Waisenamt" ("Bureau of Poverty and Orphans"). It might be considered an unremarkable appointment even at the time, except that Meta Hammerschlag was a woman. It seems to have been Hammerschlag's first job to be undertaken directly on behalf of the city authorities: it would not be the last. In 1913 she became a member of Frankfurt's "Childcare Commission". She also used her growing experience of city governance to promote the training of women for work, notably in the "social professions": in 1913 she initiated the "Women's Seminar for Professional Social Work" ("Frauenseminar für soziale Berufsarbeit") in Frankfurt.

=== SPD ===
Before 1908 women had been banned from participation in politics. It is fair to add that the constitutional prohibition had not been inferred with and enforced with equal conviction in every part of Germany. Nevertheless, across most of Germany, and especially in Prussia, national and state-level constitutional provisions been had widely been interpreted as a ban on membership of a political party for those German citizens who were also women. Just three year later, in 1911, Meta Hammerschlag joined the Social Democratic Party (SPD). The move would have been considered an unusual one in view of her middle-class origins. The SPD was still outside the political mainstream in the eyes of Germany's political establishment which, thanks to unevenly configured voting districts and impressively unequal voting systems and rules across – especially – Prussia, still dominated the Reichstag (national parliament) in Berlin. Closer to home, Hammerschlag had by this time become one of the leading women progressives in the Frankfurt political firmament.

=== Second marriage ===
Through her party membership Meta Hammerschlag very quickly came across the journalist-politician Max Quarck. Over the next few years they would work closely together on a shared political and social agenda which included the rights of women. Dr. Max Ernst Quarck was a long-standing SPD activist who had been attending national party congresses as a delegate from Frankfurt am Main regularly since 1894. He had been a member of the Frankfurt City Council since 1901 (initially as the only SPD councillor). In January 1912 – after a series of electoral disappointments – he had been elected to membership of the Reichstag (national parliament), representing the Frankfurt electoral district. Initial impressions, when Meta Hammerschlag met Max Quarck for the first time in 1911, were anything but cordial, however. In the course of a meeting held to prepare for the general election of January 1912, the two of them argued passionately about various women's political issues. It took a carefully drafted "letter of rapprochement" to forge a wary truce: sources indicate that Dr. Quarck was won round to Mrs. Hammeraschlag's point of view. Five years later, in December 1916, the two of them married.

=== War ===
Between July 1914 and November 1918 Germany was at war. In 1917 Max Quarck resigned from various senior journalistic roles because he found himself no longer able to back the SPD policy of supporting the prosecution of the war with their votes in parliament. (He never resigned his party membership, however: many did.) By the time of their marriage, Meta Quarck-Hammerschlag and her husband were working together in a large shared office in part of the coach house in the grounds of her parents' family home, in which her widowed mother evidently still resided. Max Quarck even came round to supporting his wife's position on "Abolitionism" (promoting the legalisation and regulation of prostitution): this meant taking a position that, for a man of his background and social standing, was very unusual at the time. In 2009 the "office building" was formally renamed, the "Meta-und-Max-Quarck-Haus". They devoted themselves to various welfare projects, rendered more vital than ever through the economic and societal impact of the war. Quarck-Hammerschlag established a "war kitchen" in the east-end of Frankfurt. The long list of organisations with which she interacted during the war years confirms that in attending to those in need she paid particular attention to small children, war-widows, prostitutes and old people. Max and Meta Quarck Hammerschlag also took a leading role in the launch of Germany's "Workers' Welfare Association" ("Arbeiterwohlfahrt" / AWO): the founding documents for local AWO office in Hessen-Nassau use as a registered address the Quarck Hammerschlag's office in their adapted coach house along the Röderbergweg.

=== City councillor ===
On 28 October 1919 Quarck-Hammerschlag became the first woman to secure election to the Frankfurt city council. Her term as an unpaid councillor ran from 1919 till 1924. She served a further term between 1926 and 1933. She took on responsibility for welfare issues and youth care, along with social training. She was elected to represent the city council on numerous ad hoc commissions and committees, such as committees for the care of those at risk, for care of the elderly, for the disabled and for the homeless. She became involved with the city's Welfare Office and, after it was set up in 1928, the "Employment hub for the disabled".

Meta-Quarck continued, as before the war, to pursue her welfare activism, serving as chair of the Hessen-Nassau regional branch of the AWO), based in Frankfurt, between 1920 and 1933. During or before 1921 she worked with the AWO) local committee in Frankfurt on tasks such as the training of volunteer helpers, presenting courses on poverty alleviation, orphan care and other workers' welfare themes. She served as a member of the supervisory board of "Palmengarten AG" and undertook voluntary work as an unpaid junior judge (Schöffin (ehrenamtlicher Richter)). She engaged actively with the "Winternot" ("Winter hardship association"), founded in 1922 in respects to the intensifying suffering resulting from the hyperinflation of the early 1920s.

Together with her husband, Meta-Quarck was also intensely interested in national politics, during a decade marked by economic auserity and intensifying political polarisation, which after the Great Depression starting in 1929 was increasingly spilling out onto the streets. The situation was reflected in parliament, as voters were seduced by populist politiciams into supporting political extremism, notably during 1932 and 1933. Parliament became deadlocked as neither the Communist nor the Nazi Party leaderships would counternance working with the in most cases more moderate democratic political parties (nor with each other). In January 1933 the National Socialists were able to use the situation to take power and transform Germany into a one-party dictatorsship. SPD councillors, including Meta-Quarck, were suspended from political office on 13 March 1933. On 16 June 1933, within a couple of weeks of the installation of Mayor Krebs (who was a committed Hitlerite) in place of Mayor Landmann (who was Jewish), Quarck-Hammerschlag was relieved of her remaining civic offices in respect of public welfare, and by early 1934 she appears to have been persuaded to withdraw from her other philanthropic and campaigning activities. In the meantime, for the second time in her life, Meta Quarck-Hammerschlag, on 21 January 1830 had become a widow, as the consequence of heart failure suffered by her husband following several years of coronary disease.

=== More war ===
War broke out again in September 1939. As the tide of the fighting turned against the German armies during 1942, Frankfurt was more badly affected than most German cities, both with regard to holocaust deportations and murders and in respect of deaths and lesser losses caused by Anglo-American bomb attacks from the sky. The family home in the Röderbergweg that her father had acquired in 1892, and in which Meta-Quarck had lived much of her life both as a single-parent widow and, later, with her second husband, was destroyed: the ruins would be taken down in 1965. In August 1943 she fled the city. For the next few years she stayed with relatives in the relative safety of Limburg an der Lahn.

=== After the war ===
War ended in May 1945. Meta Quarck-Hammerschlag returned to live in what remained of Frankfurt am Main in 1946 or 1948. She was now in the – for her – unfamiliar position of being desperately short of money. Quarck-Hammerschlag was now taken in to the home of Marie Bittorf. From this point the two women lived together in Bittorf's little apartment in Frankfurt-Bornheim. Despite the 22-year difference in their ages, the two women had much in common in terms of their political beliefs, objectives and achievements. They formed a close friendship and collaborated tirelessly to restore the quality of welfare-related benefits provided to workers in Frankfurt.

Financial pressures were eased in April 1952 when the Frankfurt city authorities agreed to provide Meta Quarck-Hammerschlag with a "small honorary pension". Further recognition followed in November 1952, when the government of the recently inaugurated "German Federal Republic" (West Germany) awarded Quarck-Hammerschlag the "Order of Merit" ("Verdienstkreuz am Bande").

On 11 August 1954, in the presence of her daughter, Meta Quarck-Hammerschlag died at Frankfurt am Main, a few months short of what would have been her ninetieth birthday.

== The family home and the coach house ==
Chrysostom Wilhelm Heinrichs, Meta's father, purchased a large "Gründerzeit" family villa at Röderbergweg 96-100 in east-central Frankfurt in 1892. As the eldest of his five daughters Meta had left home and married by this time. However, she had then been widowed in 1889, so in 1892 had welcomed the opportunity to move into her parents' house with her daughter. By the time she remarried in 1916 her father had died, but her mother lived on in the family villa and Meta also based herself at the property. She and her husband used as an office the house in the grounds which sources describe variously as the gardener's lodge or the coach house. During the Second World War the main family villa was destroyed, or at least rendered uninhabitable. The destruction operation was completed only in 1965. The site that the main house formerly occupied is now occupied by the "August-Stunz-Zentrum", a retirement and recuperation home.

The coach house, part of which Meta Quarck-Hammerschlag and her second husband had converted for use as a shared office and, increasingly, library, survived the war and at some point came under the direct control of the regional AWO, which Quarck-Hammerschlag had done so much to create and develop. It was used for various purposes. It was renamed as the "Meta-und-Max-Quarck-Haus" in 2009 and currently houses the AWO historical archive and history workshop facility. Since 2011 the archive has been substantially expanded through the gifting by one of her nieces (resident in Limburg an der Lahn) and her great granddaughter (resident in southern Italy) of papers, pictures and other memorabilia associated with and/or previously owned by Meta Quarck-Hammerschlag.

== Burial ==
Meta Quarck-Hammerschlag's body is buried in the Hammerschlag burial plot at the Frankfurt Main Cemetery, adjacent to that of Max Quarck, her second husband. The bodies of her first husband is close by and those of parents are included in the same little plot along with those of a further five friends and relations, including Marie Bittorf with whom she lived during the final years of her life. (Note: The grave of Meta Quarck-Hammerschlag und Max Quarck is in the Frankfurt Main Cemetery.)
