= Franz Karl Delavilla =

Austrian German illustrator

Franz Karl Delavilla (6 December 1884 – 2 August 1967) was an Austrian-German graphic artist, illustrator, designer and art professor.

== Education ==
Born in Vienna, Delavilla first received a one-year apprenticeship at the Technologisches Gewerbemuseum and then was a pupil at the K.K. Technical College for Textile Industry Vienna from 1901 to 1903. In 1903, he won the 1st prize for the best work in drawing at the competition of the 'Niederösterreichischer Gewerbeverein'.

From 1903 to 1908, he was a state scholarship holder at the University of Applied Arts Vienna of the K.K. Austrian Museum of Art and Industry, where he was taught by Carl Otto Czeschka and Bertold Löffler, among others. From 1907, he got first commissions for applied arts and from the same year he worked at the "Wiener Werkstätte", a production association of visual artists, which existed from 1904 until 1932. Designs for jewellery, fashion, stage designs, posters, cards for various occasions and the illustration of books were his metier. From 1908, the workshop held an annual art show, where Delavilla's works were also shown.

== Teaching activity until 1944 ==
In 1908/09, Delavilla held a teaching post at the Kunstgewerbe- und Handwerkerschule Magdeburg and from 1909 to 1913, at the University of Fine Arts of Hamburg.

From 1913 to 1920, he was head of the class for "free graphics and surface art" at the school of arts and crafts of the Mitteldeutsche Kunstgewerbeverein of the Polytechnische Gesellschaft in Frankfurt. In 1914, he was awarded the "Goldenen Preis" of the International Exhibition for Book Trade and Graphics in Leipzig and in the same year he participated in the Werkbund Exhibition in Cologne.

From 1917 until 1933, Delavilla worked as a part-time scenic designer in Frankfurt and Darmstadt. In 1919, he was also a member of the Dresden Secession. In 1922, he became a teacher at the Städelschule in Frankfurt and led the lithography class. In 1923, he was appointed professor. In 1936, he and his colleagues Hugo Bäppler and Albert Windisch accepted a commission from the Ministry of the Reichswehr and designed with a class common rooms of the newly built Olympisches Dorf in Berlin. For this design with Merkbilder of the German landscape, he and his group received an Olympic Medal from Adolf Hitler.

In 1943, he took part in the exhibition Junge Kunst im Deutschen Reich in Vienna, organised by Reichsleiter Baldur von Schirach and thus came under the criticism of conservative Nazi circles. In 1944, he was released into early retirement.

== Post-war activity ==
During World War II, Delavilla's Frankfurt studio with many of his works burned down. Awards which he had received during the Nazi era prevented his application for Wiedergutmachung after the war. In 1946, he was reinstated as professor at the Städelschule and retired for good in 1950. In 1955, he was awarded the Federal Cross of Merit. In 1959, he was awarded the Ehrenplakette der Stadt Frankfurt am Main and the Goethe-Plakette des Landes Hessen. Delavilla died in Frankfurt at the age of 82. His grave is located on the Frankfurt Main Cemetery.

In 2004, the Kronberg Gallery exhibited some of his works.

== Publications ==
- Arthur Roessler: Der Dialog vom Pierrot und andere Essays, Vienna: Karl Graeser [1907] (Umschlag/Titelbild von Delavilla)
- Des Freiherrn von Münchhausen Abenteuer und Reisen; newly edited by Alois Th. Schlagbrandtner. Buchschmuck von Franz K. Delavilla, Vienna: Graeser & Kie., ca. 1910
- Unser Hamburg. Ed. by the Journalists' and Writers' Association for Hamburg, Altona and the surrounding area. With book decoration by F. K. Delavilla, Hamburg 1911, 116 p. (auch weitere Auflagen)
- Kriegsbilderbogen Deutscher Künstler, Mappe III, Munich: Goltz-Verlag 1915
- Die Reise zum Meer. fairy tales by Maria Benemann and headpieces by F. K. Delavilla, Weimar: Kiepenheuer 1915, 95 p.
- Gottfried Gurcke: Hamburger Fibel bearbeitet von W.Böhling, J.Spiering und A.Winckler. Pictures byF. K. Delavilla. Schreibschrift von Chr.Seemann, 244. neubearbeitete Auflage, Hamburg: Otto Meißner, 1917
- Deutsche Bühne. Jahrbuch der Frankfurter Städtischen Bühnen. Edited by Georg J. Plotke on behalf of the Generalintendanz . Vol. 1: Spielzeit 1917/1918. Mit 6 (1 farb.) Taf. (m. Bühnenbild-Entwürfen v. Delavilla u. a.) u. 7 Abb. im Text, Frankfurt: Rütten & Loening 1919, 4 vol., 402 p.
- Clara Berg: Schnurli-Butzli und andere deutsche Märchen mit Bildern K. F. Delavilla, Frankfurt: Englert und Schlosser, 20.–30. Tausend, ca. 1925, 123 p.
- Wilhelm Fronemann: Bundschuh flieg! Ein Zeitbild vom großen Bauernaufstand im Jahre 1525. With pictures by F. K. Delavilla, Stuttgart: Loewe 1936, 3rd edition 1942
