= Heinrich Hasselhorst =

German painter (1825–1904)

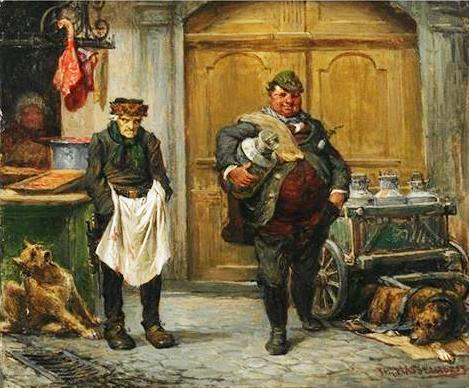
At the Milk Vendor's Stall

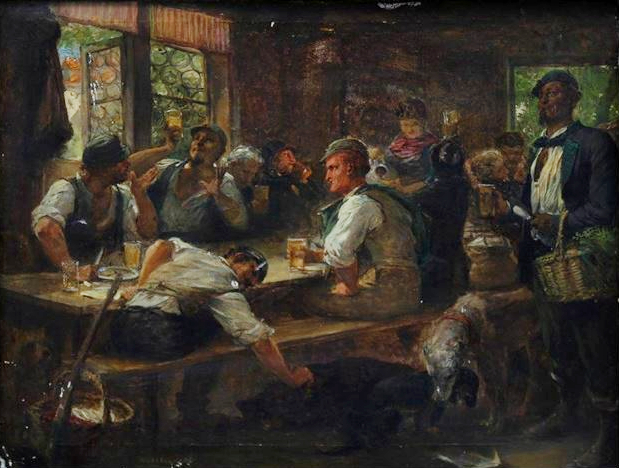
In the Tavern

Johann Heinrich Hasselhorst (4 April 1825 – 7 August 1904) was a German genre painter and drawing teacher.

== Life and work ==
He was born in Frankfurt am Main and began his studies in 1842 at the Städelschule, where his primary instructors were Jakob Becker and Moritz von Schwind. He continued his studies in Paris (1852) and Rome (1855).

In 1861, he accompanied the "Nordland Trip", a private expedition to Jan Mayen and Iceland, organized by the financier and landowner, Georg Berna. During the trip, he created numerous landscapes and coastal scenes of both areas, which are now on display at the Historical Museum, Frankfurt. In 1863, a travelogue of the journey was published, with his illustrations.

During this time, he became a drawing teacher at the Städelschule. One of his early students was the polar explorer, Julius von Payer, who would become known for his monumental depictions of his own adventures. In Hasselhorst's later years, an entire generation of young Frankfurt artists were his students, including Joseph Kaspar Correggio, Emil Beithan, and Hermann Treuner.

He is interred at Frankfurt Main Cemetery. Many of his best known works may be seen at the Museum Giersch.

== Sources ==
- Faszination Fremde. Bilder aus Europa, dem Orient und der Neuen Welt, Museum Giersch, Frankfurt am Main, 2013
- Magie des Augenblicks – Skizzen und Studien in Öl, Museum Giersch, Frankfurt am Main, 2009
- Frankfurt und der Nordpol, Historisches Museum Frankfurt, Frankfurt am Main, 2007, ISBN 978-3-86568-285-7
- Johann Heinrich Hasselhorst und seine Schüler. Zwei Generationen am Städel, Exhibition catalog, Gesellschaft zur Förderung Frankfurter Malerei, Eugenie Börner (Ed.), 2004, ISBN 3-932220-24-2
