= Johann Friedrich von Meyer =

German politician (1772–1849)

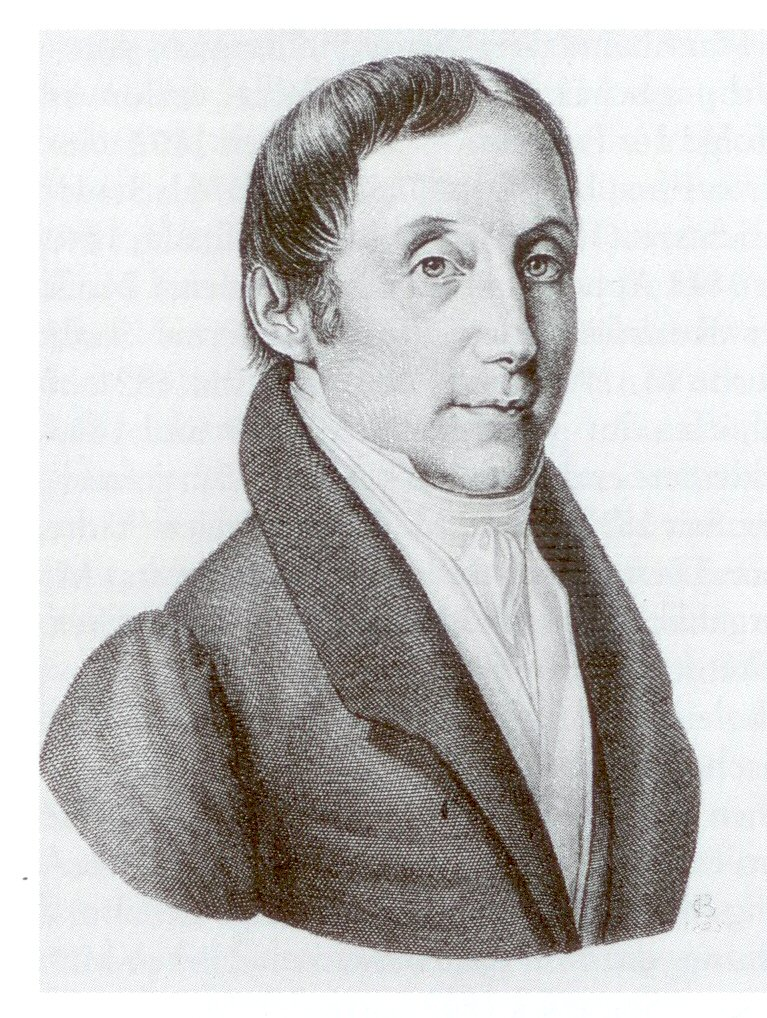

Johann Friedrich von Meyer (12 September 1772 – 28 January 1849) was a German translator, politician, and senator of Frankfurt, who published a translation of the Bible in 1819 (Die heilige Schrift in berichtigter Übersetzung mit kurzen Anmerkungen; 2nd edition, 1823; 3rd edition, 1855).

He studied law at the University of Göttingen and attended lectures on philosophy and natural sciences at Leipzig University. In 1799 he became a trainee at the Reichskammergericht in Wetzlar, and in 1807 was appointed to the Stadtgerichtsrat (city court council) in Frankfurt. On three occasions he served as alteren bürgermeister (senior mayor), and from 1837 was a representative of the four Freien Städte (Free Cities) to the German Bundestag.

In 1816 he founded the Frankfurt Bible Society.
