= Georg Ludwig Kriegk =

German historian and archivist (1805–1878)

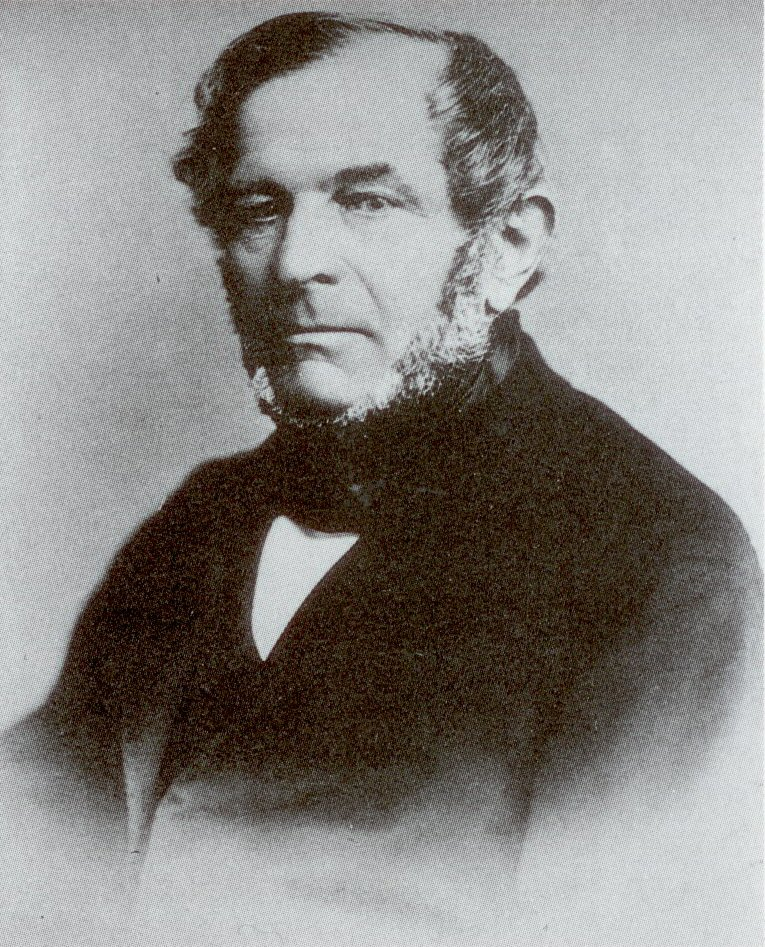
Georg Ludwig Kriegk (1805–1878)

Georg Ludwig Kriegk (February 25, 1805 – May 28, 1878) was a German historian and archivist born in Darmstadt.

He studied history and philology at the Universities of Heidelberg and Giessen, and from 1825 spent several years working as a tutor to a patrician family in Frankfurt am Main. In 1834 he obtained his doctorate from the University of Marburg, subsequently working as a private scholar in Frankfurt. Here he was a member of several learned societies, giving lectures in the fields of ethnology, geography and history.

Beginning in 1848 he taught classes at the municipal high school in Frankfurt, also serving as chairman of the school association. In 1863 he was appointed archivist to the city of Frankfurt, a position he maintained until his retirement in 1875.

Kriegk was an avid archaeologist, conducting excavations of the ancient Roman settlement of Nida, located in the present-day district of Heddernheim.

== Written works ==
Kriegk was a prolific author, publishing works on the history of medieval city republics, books on the history of Frankfurt am Main, and writings about Frankfurt native Johann Wolfgang von Goethe. In addition, he edited the first edition of Friedrich Christoph Schlosser's Weltgeschichte für das deutsche Volk (World History for the German People). A few of his better known publications are as follows:

- Frankfurter Bürgerzwiste und Zustände im Mittelalter (Frankfurt citizenry and states of strife in the Middle Ages, (1862)
- Deutsches Bürgerthum im Mittelalter (German bourgeoisie in the Middle Ages 1868/1871)
- Die Brüder Senckenberg, nebst einem Anhang über Goethes Jugendzeit (The Brothers Senckenberg, with an appendix on Goethe's youth, 1869)
- Geschichte von Frankfurt am Main in ausgewählten Darstellungen (History of Frankfurt am Main in selected images, 1871)
- Deutsche Kulturbilder aus dem 18. Jahrhundert, mit einem Anhang: Goethe als Rechtsanwalt (German cultural images from the 18th Century, with an appendix: Goethe as a lawyer, 1874)
