= Buğra =

Buğra is a Turkish name and may refer to:

== Given name ==
- Buğra Gülsoy (born 1982), Turkish actor, screenwriter, producer, architect, director, graphic designer and photographer
- Buğra Selimzade (born 1988), Turkish sport shooter
- Buğra Ünal (born 1997), Turkish Olympian modern pentathlete
- Ekrem Buğra Ekinci (born 1966), Turkish academic in History of Turkish Law and Islamic Law
- Rahman Buğra Çağıran, (born 1995), Turkish football player

== Surname ==
- Satuq Bogra Khan, Kara-Khanid ruler
- Abdullah Bughra, emir of First East Turkestan Republic
- Muhammad Amin Bughra, father of Abdulla Bugra
- Nur Ahmadjan Bughra
- Ayşe Buğra, Turkish social scientist
- Tarık Buğra (1918–1994), Turkish journalist, novelist and short story author

== See also ==
- Buğra, Kalecik, a village in the District of Kalecik, Ankara Province, Turkey
