= Frankfurt Zoological Garden =

Zoo in Germany

Zoo Frankfurt
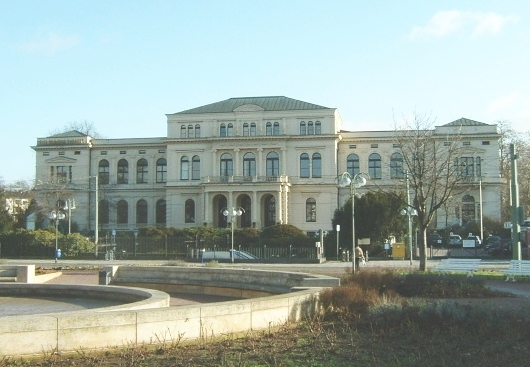
- Main entrance
- Interactive map of Zoo Frankfurt
- 50°06′56″N 8°42′11″E
- Date opened: 1858; 168 years ago
- Location: Bernhard-Grzimek-Allee 1, 60316 Frankfurt, Hesse, Germany
- Land area: 11 ha (27 acres)
- No. of animals: about 4500
- No. of species: about 450
- Annual visitors: 830.193 (2015)
- Memberships: WAZA, EAZA, VdZ
- Major exhibits: Asiatic lion, Gorilla, Spectacled bear, Sumatran tiger
- Owner: Frankfurt
- Public transit: Zoo; 14 Zoo
- Website: zoo-frankfurt.de

The Frankfurt Zoological Garden is the zoo of Frankfurt, Germany. It features over 4,500 animals of over 510 species on more than 11 hectares. The zoo was founded in 1858 and is the second oldest zoo in Germany, after Berlin Zoological Garden. It lies in the western part of the Ostend (East End), near the city center. Bernhard Grzimek was director of the zoo after World War II from 1945 until 1974.

The Frankfurt Zoological Society (FZS) was founded in 1858 by citizens of Frankfurt to establish the Zoological Garden, which it operated until the First World War. The city council then assumed responsibility for the zoo until 1950, when the FZS again became the zoo's development association.
