= Karl Ballenberger =

German artist

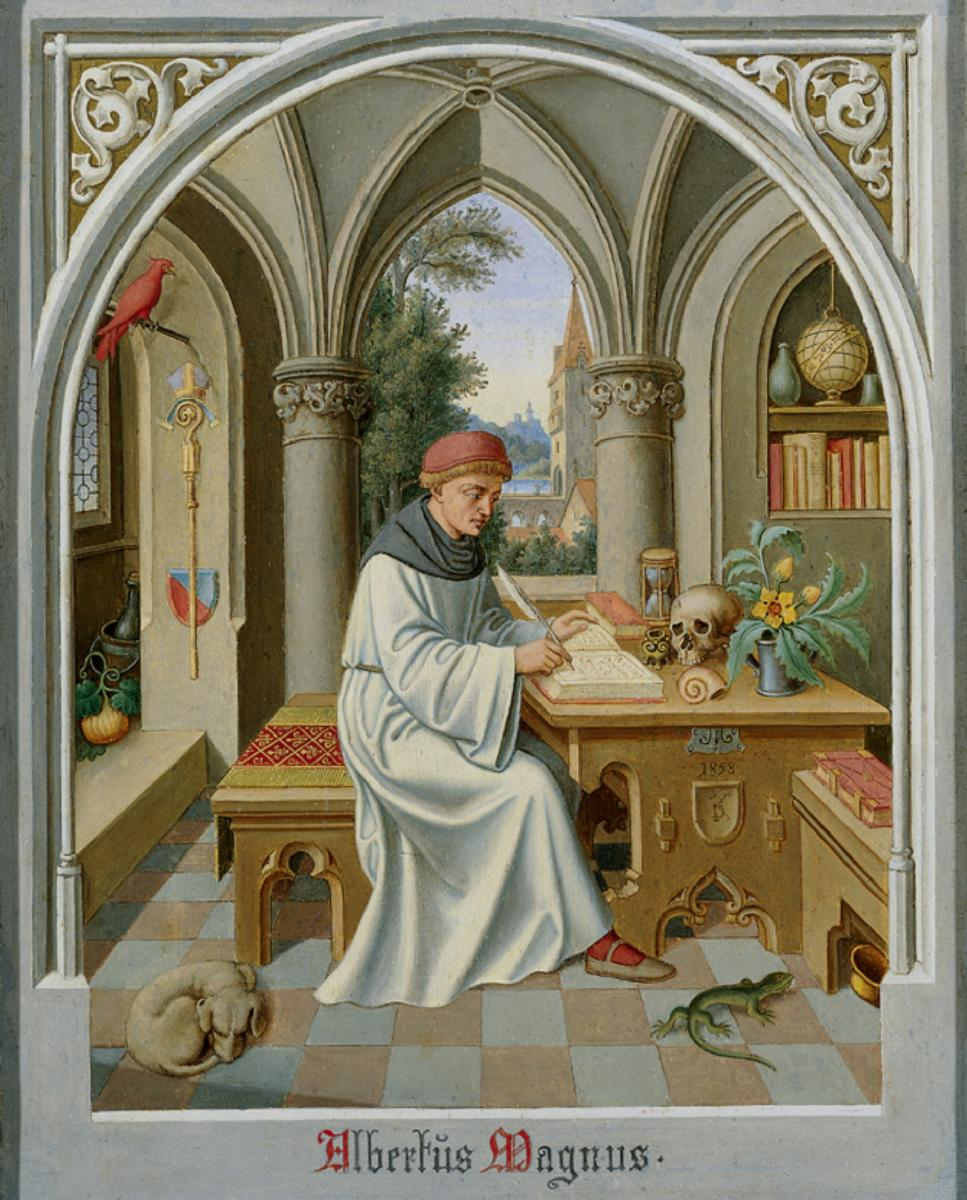
Albertus Magnus in his Study

Karl Ballenberger (1801–1860) was a 19th-century German painter who worked in an archaic, medievalising style.

== Life ==
Ballenberger was born at Ansbach on 24 July 1801, the son of a carpenter. He attended a drawing school and worked as decorator in a porcelain factory in Bruckberg, before becoming a stonemason. In 1831 he moved to Munich, where he was instructed in drawing by Friedrich Hoffstadt, a collector of medieval art who later published his Gotisches A-B-C Buch with illustrations by himself and Ballenberger. Ballenberger then attended the city's Academy. During his period in Munich he carved the ornaments on the Gothic tower of the church at Nördlingen, and also painted a stained glass window in the choir there.

In 1833 he moved to Frankfurt am Main with Hoffstadt. There he studied at the Städelsches Kunstinstitut, then under the direction of the Nazarene painter Philipp Veit. When Veit resigned from the Kunstinstitut, Ballenberger, with a group of other students, followed him to the Deutsche Haus in Sachsenhausen.

Ballenberger made a close study of early German art, and painted in an archaic, medievalising style. Although his works were hard in drawing and colouring, he achieved considerable success. He was commissioned to paint four portraits, those of Conrad I, Ludwig of Bavaria, Günther von Schwarzburg and Rupert of the Palatinate, for the Imperial Hall of the "Römer", at Frankfurt. He also painted a large picture for the city of Augsburg, depicting the history of the Reformation there. Other works included series of scenes from legendary, historical, literary or religious subjects, sometimes on canvas or wood, and sometimes in watercolour on paper.

He etched a plate of the arms of artists. His Death of St. Meinrad was engraved by Heinrich Nüsser.

He died at Frankfurt on 21 September 1860.

== See also ==
- List of German painters

== Sources ==
- Kelchner, Ernst (1875). "Ballenberger, Karl". Allgemeine Deutsche Biographie. Vol. 2. Duncker & Humblot. pp. 21–2.
