= Ostend (Frankfurt am Main) =

- Quarter of Frankfurt am Main
- Location of the Ostend (red) and the Ortsbezirk Innenstadt IV (light red) within Frankfurt am Main
- Interactive map of Ostend
- Location within Germany Location within Hesse
- Coordinates: 50°06′47″N 08°42′02″E
- Country: Germany
- State: Hesse
- Admin. region: Darmstadt
- District: Urban district
- City: Frankfurt am Main

Area
  - Total: 6.432 km^{2} (2.483 sq mi)

Population (2020-12-31)
  - Total: 29,704
  - Density: 4,618/km^{2} (11,960/sq mi)
- Time zone: UTC+01:00 (CET)
  - Summer (DST): UTC+02:00 (CEST)
- Postal codes: 60314, 60316, 60385
- Dialling codes: 069
- Vehicle registration: F
- Website: www.ostend.de

Ostend (German pronunciation: [ˈɔstʔɛnt]) is a quarter of Frankfurt am Main, Germany. It is part of the Ortsbezirk Innenstadt IV. The name means "East End".

The Frankfurt Zoological Garden, the East Harbor, the former Großmarkthalle and the Frankfurt School of Finance & Management are some of the well-known institutions in the Ostend. The European Central Bank has also built their new seat close to the Großmarkthalle at the Main river. The Hoch Conservatory are also located in the Ostend.

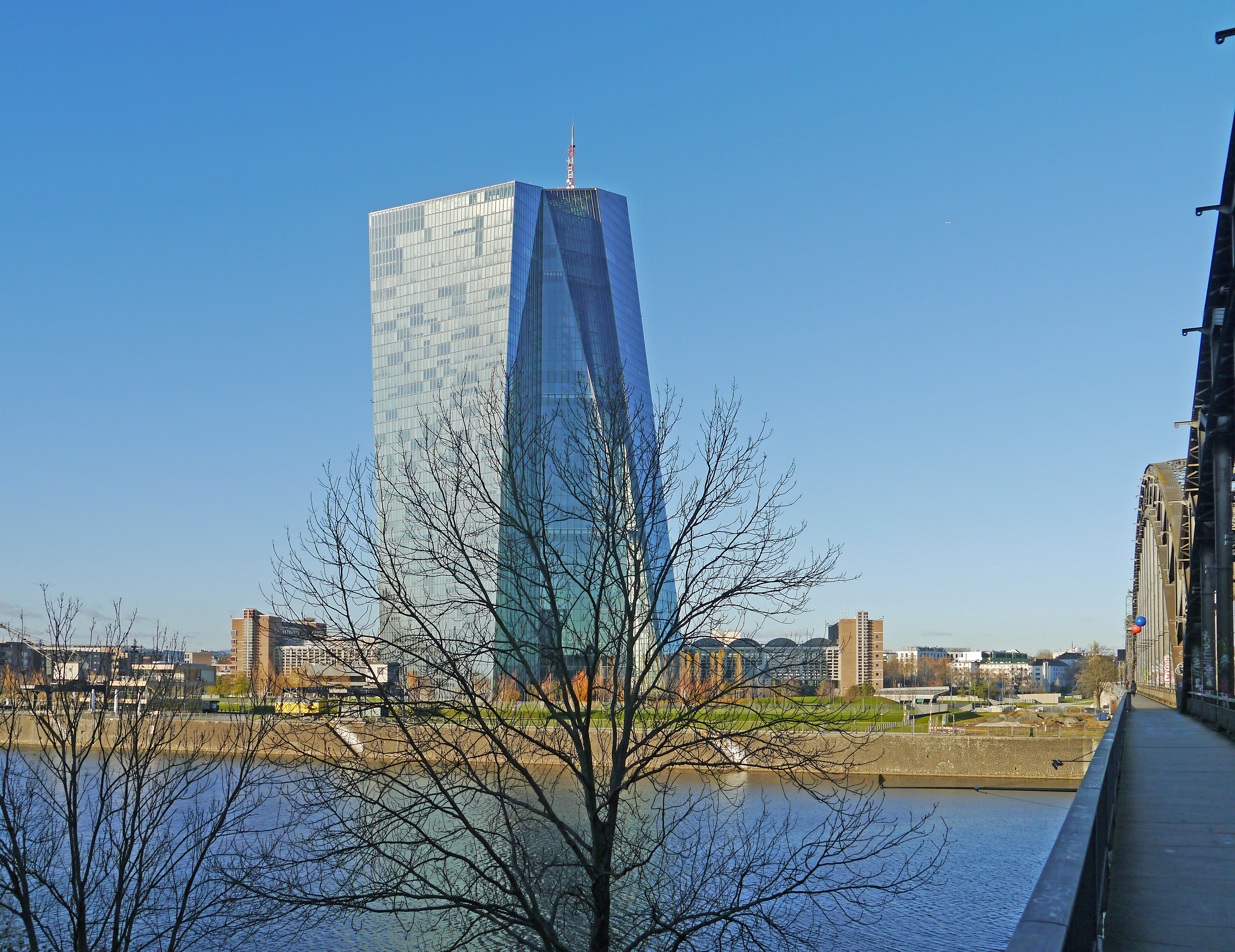
Seat of the ECB

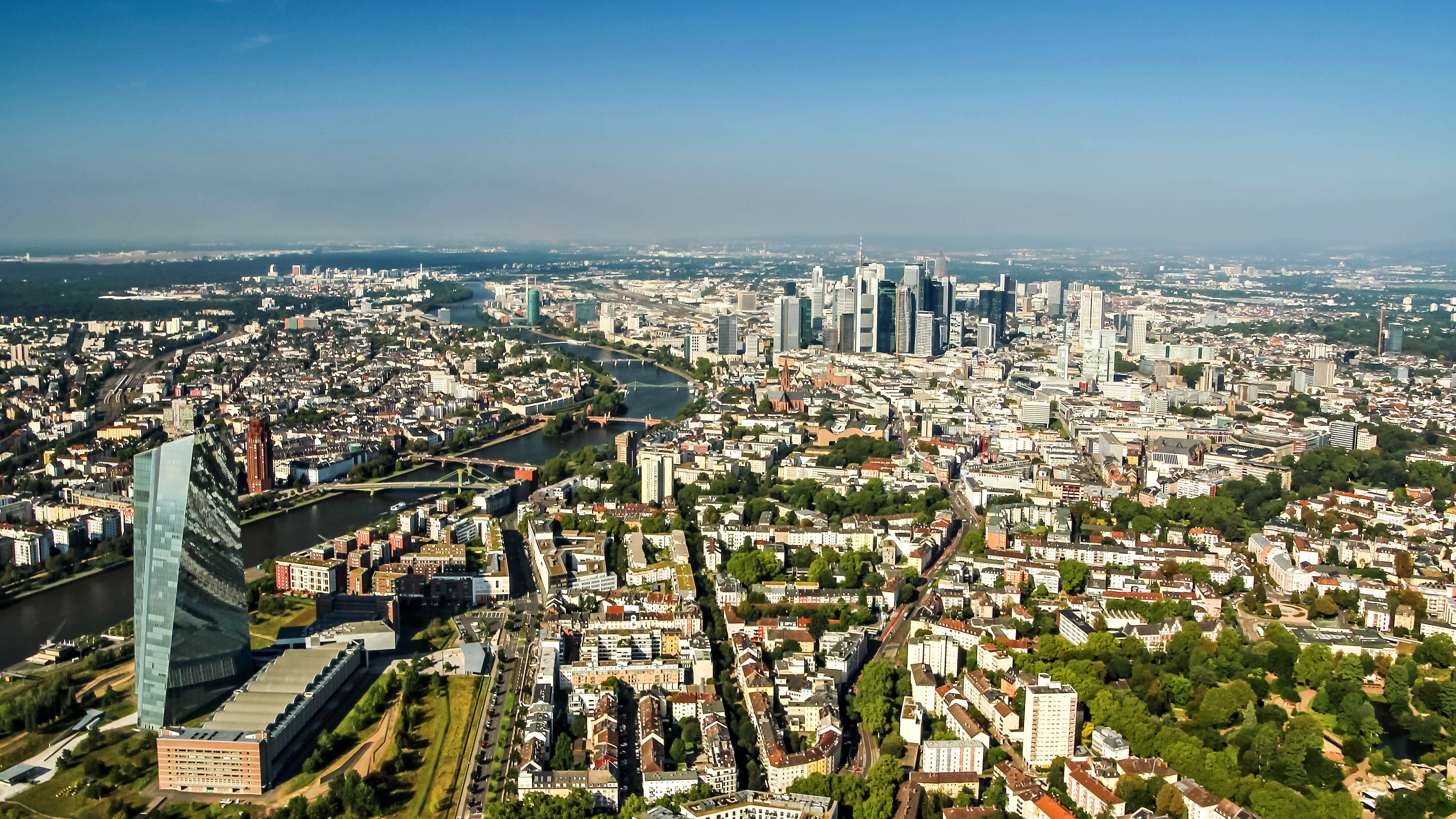
aerial view of Ostend

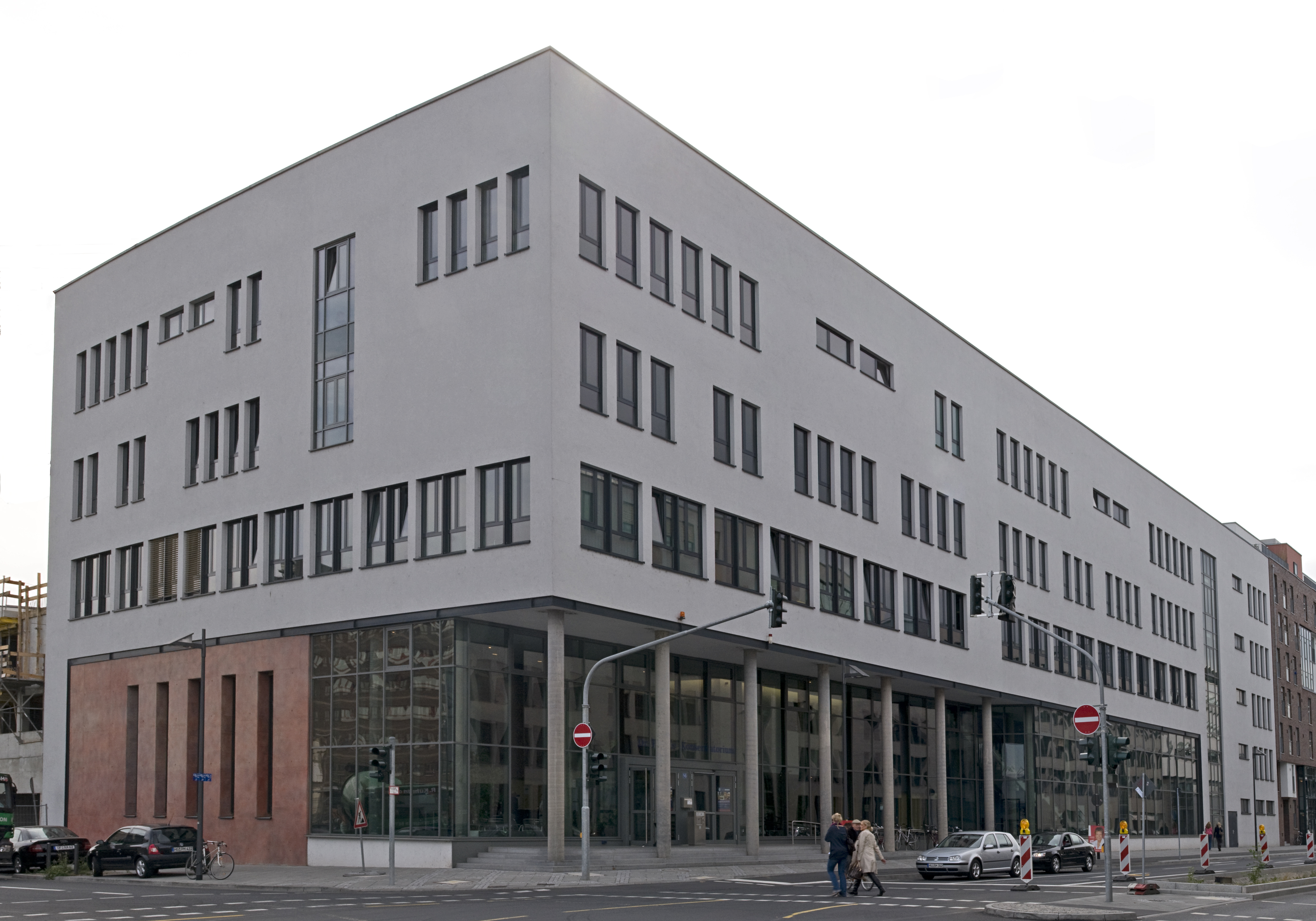
Sonnenmannstraße 16. Home of the Hoch Conservatory
