= Adolf Stachel =

German chemist (1913–1971)

- Born: 28 February 1913; Augsburg, Germany
- Died: 1971; Frankfurt am Main, Germany
- Occupation: Chemist
- Employer: Cassella

Adolf Stachel (born 28 February 1913 in Augsburg, died 1971 in Frankfurt am Main) was a German chemist, researcher and inventor, who worked as a researcher at the chemical and pharmaceutical company Cassella (now Sanofi) in Frankfurt-Fechenheim for much of his career.

He held a doctoral degree in chemistry (Doktoringenieur) from the Technische Hochschule München. Early in his career, he was a mentee and collaborator of the Nobel Prize-winning chemist Hans Fischer, who was his doctoral supervisor. He later became a researcher at Cassella. His patents were related to basically substituted heterocyclic compounds, e.g. 2,3-benzotriazine-4(3H)-one derivatives (coumarin), and basically substituted 1H,3H)-quinazoline-2-thion-4-one derivatives, having excellent coronary dilator properties. Patentee was Cassella. When working at Cassella, he was a close collaborator of Armin K.W. Kutzsche. Together with Werner Zerweck they developed Nu-nu-dibenzylsulfamyl benzoic acid, US patent 2805250 A, in the early 1950s. Other frequent collaborators were Rudi Beyerle, Rolf-Eberhard Nitz and Klaus Resag.

He was married to Ingeburg Lydia Katharina Rodenhausen (1923-2008).

== Selected publications ==
- Stachel A (1939), Über Dimethoxy-dipyrromethene und Dihalogendipyrromethene und ihre Umsetzungen, doctoral dissertation, Technische Hochschule München, 23 February 1939, 31 pages.
- Fischer H, Stachel A (1939), "Über Dimethoxy-dipyrromethene und Dihalogen-dipyrromethene und ihre Umsetzungen," Hoppe-Seyler's Zeitschrift für physiologische Chemie (= Biological Chemistry), Volume 258, Issue 2–3, pp. 121–136, doi: 10.1515/bchm2.1939.258.2-3.121. Based on the above dissertation.
- Stachel A, Kutzsche A, Zerweck W (1957). Nu-nu-dibenzylsulfamyl benzoic acid. US Patent US 2805250 A.
- Beyerle R, Nitz RE, Resag K, Stachel A (1971). Pharmacologically-active trimethoxybenzoxyalkyl-piperazino(1')compounds. US Patent US 3594384 A.
- Stachel A, Nitz RE (1966). Method of increasing sodium chloride excretion. US Patent US 3250676 A.
- Stachel A, Nitz RE, Resag K, Kreiskott H (1968). Theophylline derivatives. US Patent US 3399195 A.
- Beyerle R, Stachel A, Nitz RE, Resag K (1970). Process for the production of coumarin derivatives. US Patent US 3541097 A.
- Beyerle R, Nitz RE, Resag K, Schraven E, Stachel A (1972). 3-({60 -substituted amino-{62 -alkoxybenzoxy-propyl)-6,7-or-6,7,8-alkoxy-1,2,3-benzotriazine-4(3h)-ones. US Patent US 3706739 A.
- Stachel A, Schraven E, Nitz RE, Resag K, Beyerle R (1973). 3-(alpha-substituted amino-beta-alkoxybenzoxypropyl)-6,7-or 6,7,8-alkoxy-1,2,3-benzotriazine-4(3h)-ones. US Patent US 3751413 A.
- Beyerle R, Stachel A (1973). Basically substituted 2,4-(1h,3h)-quinazolindione derivatives. US Patent US 3718648 A.
- Stachel A, Beyerle R, Kunze W, Nitz RE, Scholtholt J (1975). Basically substituted 1(2H)-phthalazinone derivatives. US Patent US 3894015 A.
- Beyerle R, Stachel A (1976). Piperazino substituted coumarin derivatives. US Patent US 3959281 A.
