= Adela Coit =

German-born suffragist and social reformer

Adela Stanton Coit (née von Gans; formerly Wetzlar; 11 September 1863 – 7 October 1932), also known as Fanny Adela Coit and Adela Wetzlar, was a German-born suffragist, campaigner and supporter of the Ethical movement, active in Britain from the late 1890s. She was a co-founder and treasurer of the International Woman Suffrage Alliance (IWSA), one of the principal international organisations of the women's suffrage movement, and chaired its London-based Headquarters Committee during the First World War.

In the IWSA, Coit worked at the financial and administrative centre of a transnational suffrage organisation whose headquarters and official paper, Jus Suffragii, moved from Rotterdam to London after the 1913 Budapest congress. She also gave financial support for the Ethical Church in Bayswater as a centre for Stanton Coit's West London Ethical Society, and worked across several British suffrage organisations, including the Women's Social and Political Union, the Women's Tax Resistance League, the National Union of Women's Suffrage Societies and the London Society for Women's Suffrage.

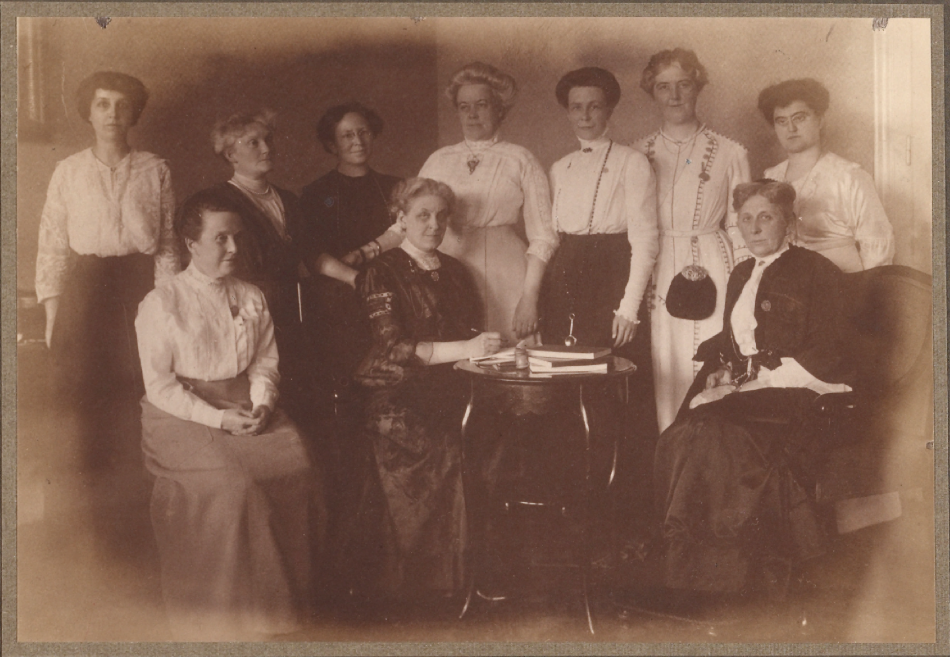
Board of the International Woman Suffrage Alliance at the 1913 Budapest congress; Coit is standing second from left.

== Early life and family ==
Coit was born Fanny Adela von Gans in Frankfurt am Main on 11 September 1863. She was the daughter of the German industrialist Friedrich Ludwig von Gans and his wife Augusta Ettling. She was born into the von Gans family of Frankfurt, a prominent German-Jewish industrial family.

She first married Moritz Benedikt Julius Wetzlar, with whom she had three children: Richard, Margaret and Elizabeth. After Wetzlar's death, she married the American-born ethical movement leader Stanton Coit on 21 December 1898. They had three daughters: Adela Isabel, Gwendolen Elizabeth and Virginia.

The Morning Post reported in December 1898 that Coit was the only woman elected a member of the Royal Institution that year.

Her daughter Margaret Wetzlar-Coit was also involved in the women's suffrage movement and attended the International Woman Suffrage Congress in Budapest in 1913. Her daughter Elizabeth, known as Dolly, married Thornely Carbutt Gibson in 1913; their children included the publisher Patrick Gibson, Baron Gibson and the actress and Bletchley Park codebreaker Pamela Rose.

== Ethical movement ==
Coit was a supporter of the Ethical movement, which promoted moral and social reform outside traditional religious doctrine. Humanist Heritage describes her humanism as "active and reformist", expressed through her work for women's suffrage and the Ethical Movement.

Her financial support was important to the development of the Ethical Church in Bayswater. Humanist Heritage states that the building at 46 Queen's Road, Bayswater, was secured in 1909 with significant financial support from Adela Coit, to act as the headquarters of the West London Ethical Society. The society reached its highest number of subscribers, 470, in the same year.

The Coit household also formed part of the society's working life. In December 1902, a meeting at 30 Hyde Park Gate, the home of Stanton and Adela Coit, adopted updated principles and aims for the West London Ethical Society. The Jane Addams Digital Edition records Stanton Coit as founder of the West London Ethical Society and notes that the purchase of the Ethical Church was funded largely by Fanny Adela Wetzlar's fortune.

== Women's suffrage ==
In 1904, Adela and Stanton Coit attended the Berlin meeting at which the International Woman Suffrage Alliance was formed. A contemporary suffrage directory later recorded that she had attended the initial Berlin meeting as an English delegate, attended all subsequent international congresses, taken part in a delegation to Sir Henry Campbell-Bannerman, marched in several suffrage processions, reportedly founded two societies in the union and belonged to the Sesame Club.

Coit held office as treasurer of the International Woman Suffrage Alliance by 1909. The Woman Suffrage Year Book of 1917 listed her among the officers of the alliance as treasurer, at 30 Hyde Park Gate, London.

At the 1913 Budapest congress, Coit reported that new headquarters, a paid secretary, an enlarged newspaper and publications would require £2,000 for the next two years; pledges of £2,510 were made. After the congress, Coit served on the IWSA Headquarters Committee with Carrie Chapman Catt, Millicent Garrett Fawcett and Chrystal Macmillan. The committee oversaw the alliance's London headquarters and its official monthly paper, Jus Suffragii, after both moved from Rotterdam to London. Its 1920 report stated that Coit chaired the committee for its first two years, that the three London members held seventy meetings between 1913 and 1920, and that Coit later reported on the wartime funding difficulties faced by the alliance.

Later scholarship on the accountant and suffragist Ethel Ayres Purdie describes Coit as treasurer of the IWSA from 1907 and links her to the appointment and work of Ayres Purdie as the alliance's auditor during and after the First World War.

Coit joined the Women's Social and Political Union in 1907, later transferring her support to the National Union of Women's Suffrage Societies. She was also involved in the Women's Tax Resistance League. On 9 March 1911, a drawing-room meeting of the league was held at her home, 30 Hyde Park Gate, with Edith Zangwill in the chair and speeches from Alice Abadam and Margaret Kineton Parkes.

In 1912, Coit joined the first Election Fighting Fund committee of the National Union of Women's Suffrage Societies, which supported candidates who officially backed women's suffrage. Mapping Women's Suffrage records that she remained a member of the committee until 1917. In 1913 she joined the executive committee of the London Society for Women's Suffrage.

Coit also hosted suffrage activity outside London. In 1912 she hosted a meeting on women's suffrage at St Clare Castle in Ryde, with speakers including Stanton Coit and Mrs Archibald Mackirdy. Mapping Women's Suffrage describes the meeting as a catalyst for the formation of the Ryde branch of the NUWSS.

During the First World War, Coit remained active in the International Woman Suffrage Alliance. Humanist Heritage states that she remained engaged with the alliance throughout the war, and Mapping Women's Suffrage notes that her obituary in the alliance journal reported that she had continued her support despite the difficulties of being a German-born woman living in England during the conflict.

At the 1929 jubilee congress of the International Woman Suffrage Alliance, Coit was honoured as one of the pioneers of the alliance.

== Death and legacy ==
Coit died on 7 October 1932 at Birling Gap, a coastal hamlet on the Seven Sisters chalk cliffs near Eastbourne, East Sussex. Her memorial service took place at Golders Green Crematorium on 10 October 1932 and was officiated by Charles Kennedy Scott. Harry Snell delivered the address, describing her as having exercised a "quiet, almost unseen, yet potent influence" and saying that her "idealism was informed and practical".
