= Carl von Weinberg =

German chemist and art collector

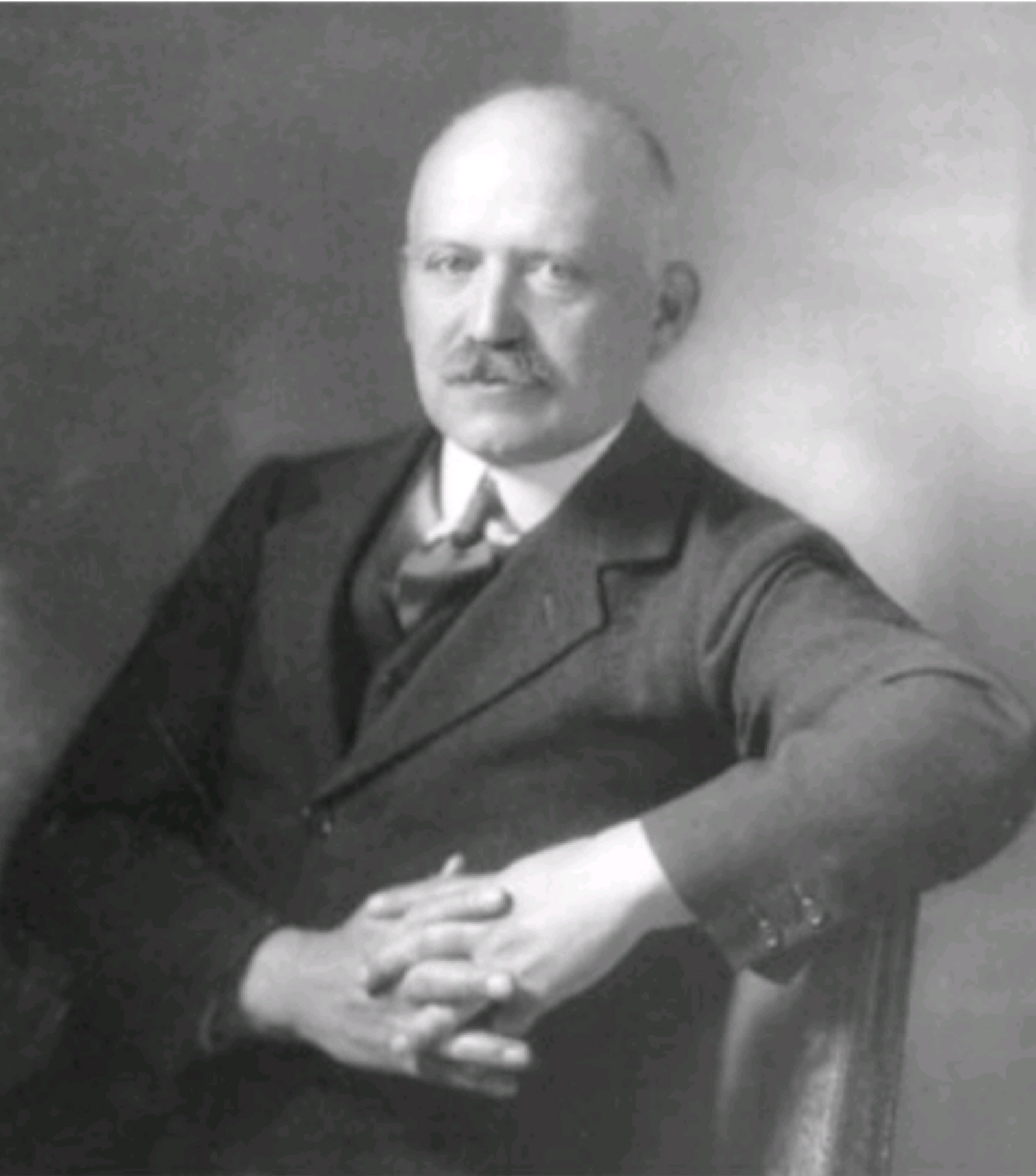
Carl von Weinberg around 1900

Carl von Weinberg (born September 14, 1861, in Frankfurt am Main; died March 14, 1943, near Florence, Italy) was a German Jewish chemist, entrepreneur, patron of the arts and philanthropist. He one of the founders of IG Farben.

== Life ==
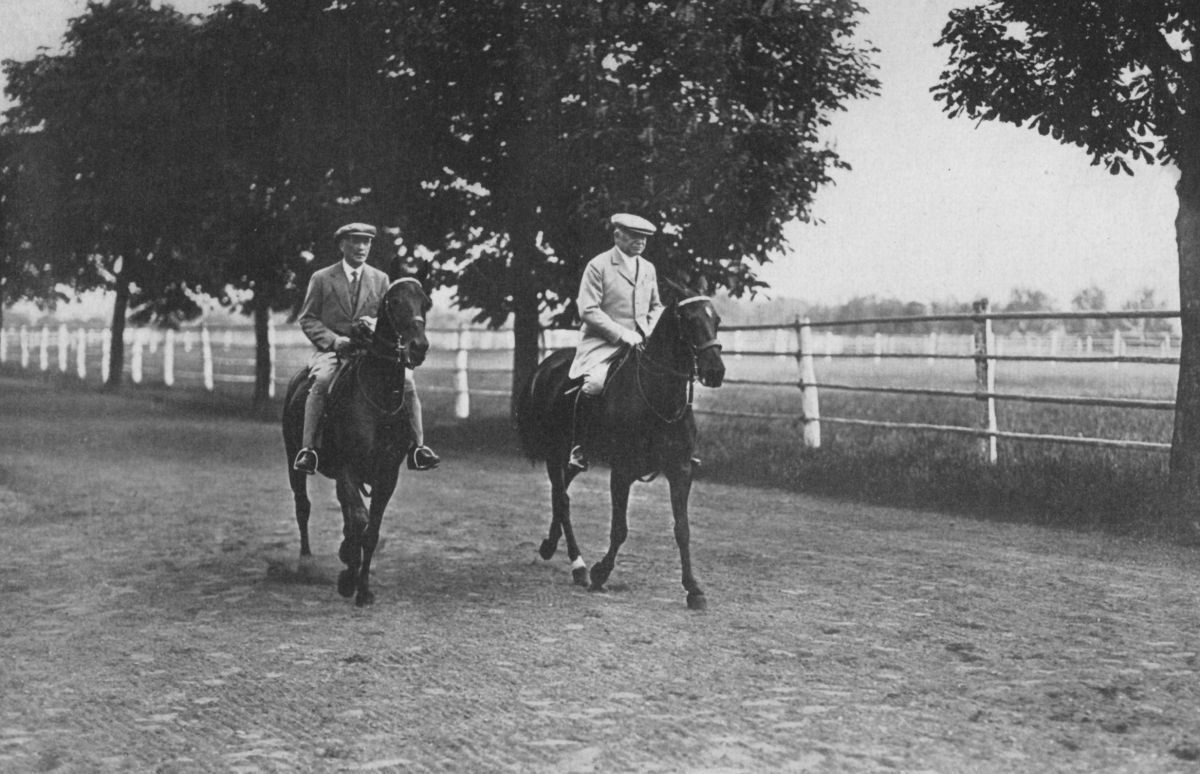
Morning ride with brother Arthur von Weinberg

Carl and his brother Arthur von Weinberg, who was one year older, came from a Jewish merchant family; their father was Bernhard Weinberg. In 1880, both brothers were baptized as Protestants. Carl completed a commercial apprenticeship and in 1882, at the age of 21, like his brother, became a partner in the Leopold Cassella & Co. company, which in 1894 merged with the Frankfurt aniline dye factory founded by his uncle Leo Gans and subsequently achieved world fame as Cassella Farbwerke Mainkur in the manufacture of synthetic dyes.

Weinberg married Ethel Mary Villiers Forbes, known as May, born in Plymouth in 1866, said to be a member of the family of the Earl of Granard. In 1898, they settled in Niederrad. Weinberg had the Villa Waldfried built in an English country house style by the architects Aage von Kauffmann and Otto Bäppler. This villa had around one hundred rooms, providing space for the couple's important art collections of over 700 objects.

In 1897, one year before they moved into the new house, their longed-for daughter Wera was born. She later married Richard von Szilvinyi and died on April 9, 1943, in London. May von Weinberg was famous in Frankfurt as a philanthropist.

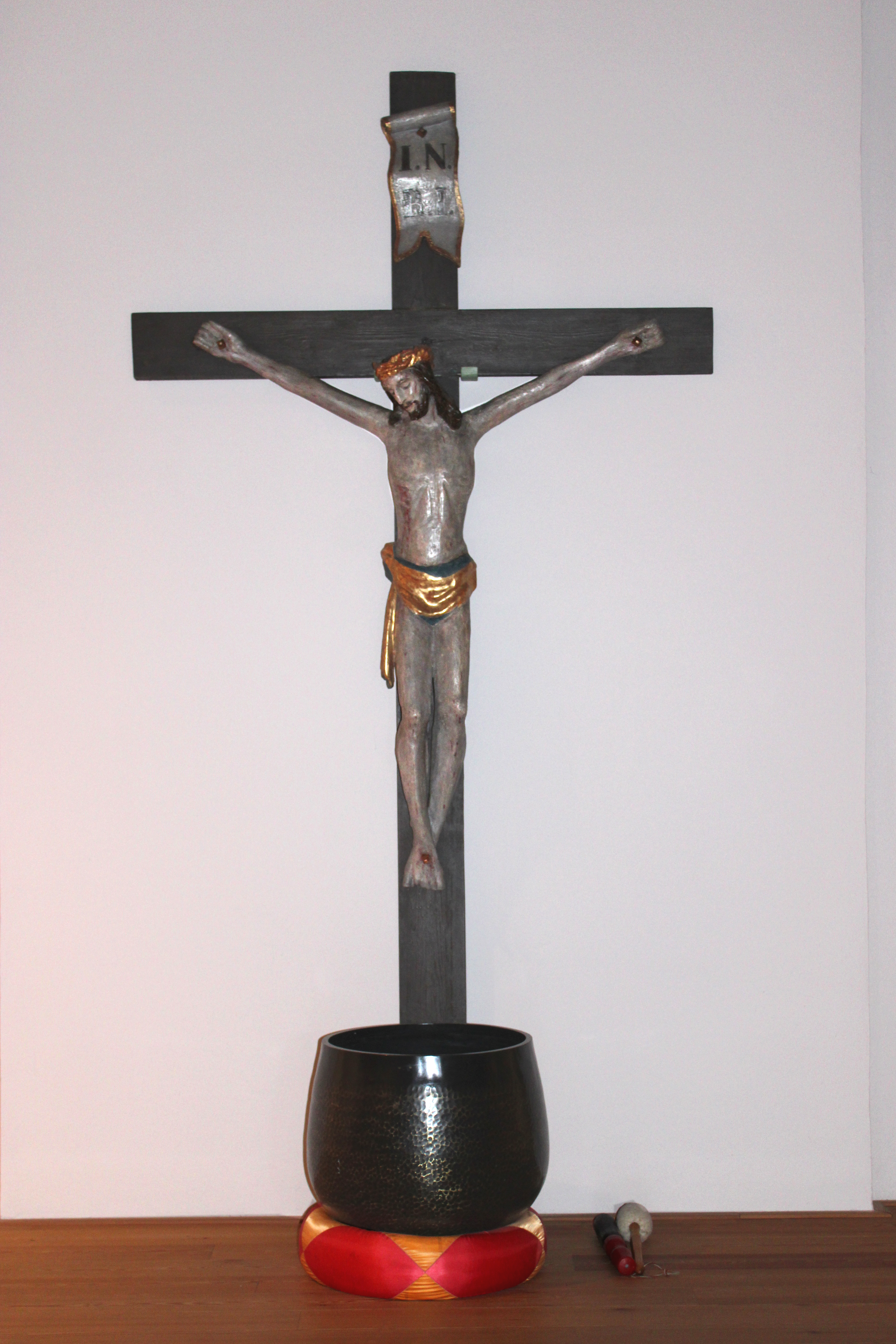
Cross from the private chapel of the Villa Waldfried

A private chapel was established in the house for May, who was a Roman Catholic. Later, the Niederrad chaplain Georg Nilges celebrated Sunday services in this chapel. Carl von Weinberg donated a considerable amount for the Niederräder parish Mother of Good Counsel for the construction of a new church.

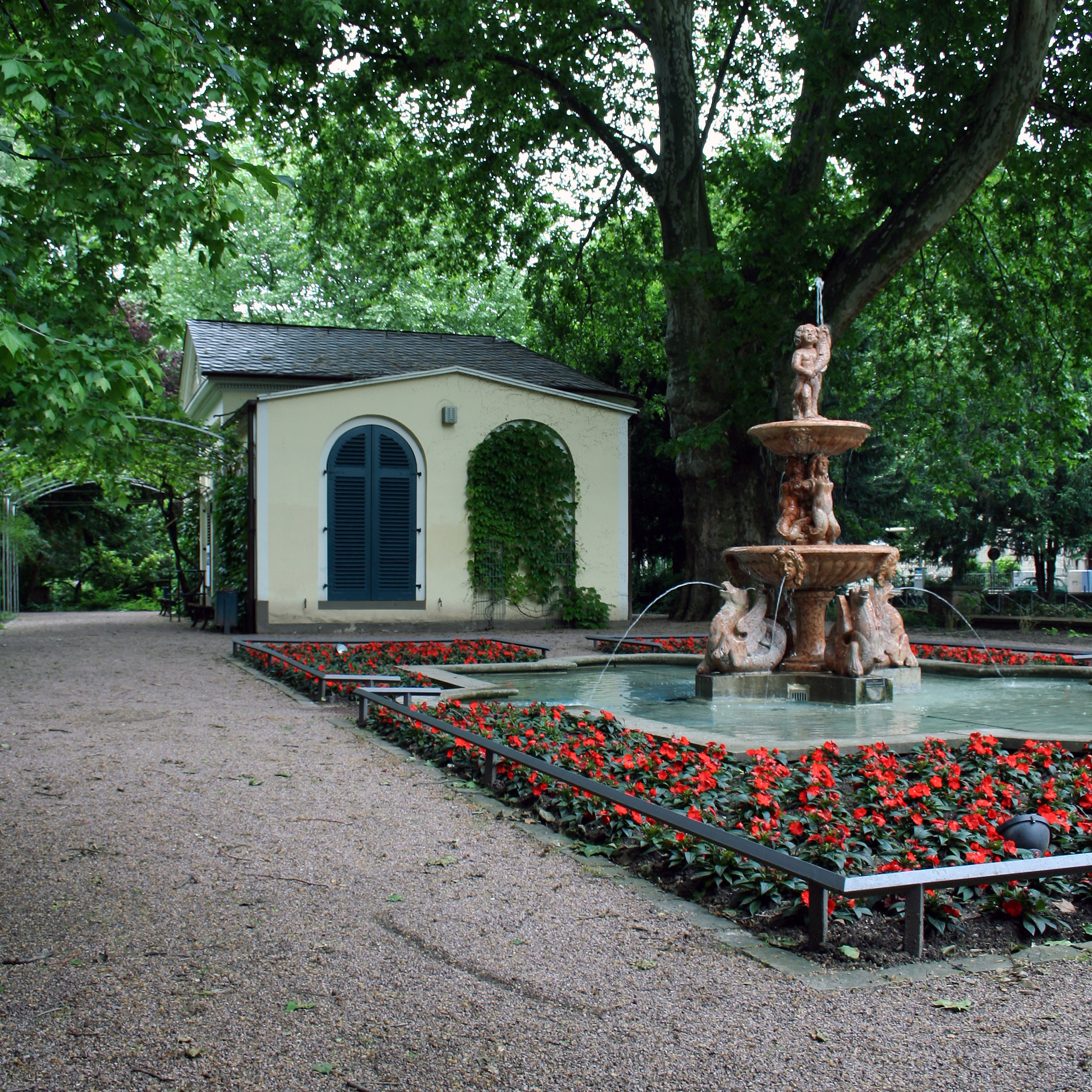
Fountain of the destroyed Villa Waldfried

The house was destroyed in the Allied air raids on Frankfurt am Main in World War II. A Florentine Italian Renaissance fountain which was at the house survived and has stood since 1952 in the garden of the Nebbienschen Gartenhaus, an artists' meeting place in the Bockenheimer Anlage in downtown Frankfurt. In 1908, the Weinberg brothers were ennobled, which had the effect of adding the word "von" to their names.

== German delegation to the 1919 Versailles peace negotiations ==
In 1919, Carl von Weinberg was a member of the German delegation to Paris for negotiations for the Treatry of Versailles. In 1924, he took part in the negotiations on German reparations in London, which resulted in the Dawes Plan. In 1925, the Weinberg brothers led Cassella-Farbwerke into a merger to form IG Farbenindustrie AG, commonly known as IG Farben, where they both served as supervisory and administrative board members.

Together with his brother, Carl von Weinberg donated to various institutions, including the University of Frankfurt. In 1921, the Carl von Weinberg School was built in Schwanheim with his support and was named for him. The founding of the Frankfurt Polo Club in 1913 and the polo grounds can also be traced back to his initiative. He also founded the Waldfried stud farm, which became known far beyond the borders of his hometown.

In 1937 his wife May died, she was buried in the vineyard chapel of the Niederräder church "Mutter vom Guten Rat". Large parts of her estate went to this parish, some parts were given to the former Niederrad chaplain Georg Nilges, who since 1929 was pastor in the newly built Holy Cross Church in Frankfurt-Bornheim in the Bornheimer Hang housing estate.

== Nazi Persecution ==
With the rise of the Nazis in 1933, the Weinberg family was persecuted because of their Jewish origins. Carl von Weinberg was forced out of his employment and positions, the school and street that had been named after him were renamed, and his property was "Aryanized", which meant that it was transferred to non-Jews in accordance with Nazi laws. In 1938, after Kristallnacht, Weinberg was forced to sell his home, Villa Waldfried, and his art collection to the city.

The Frankfurt artist Lina von Schauroth, a close friend of the Weinbergs, managed to bring the four stained glass windows she had created in the private chapel of Villa Waldfried to safety, after the former owner of the house had fled. During the war, they were kept in the Limburg Cathedral Museum, and in 1951, at the instigation of the Protestant Synod, they were installed in the nave of the Old St. Nicholas Church, near Frankfurt's Römer. The "Ascending Christ" window on the west side has this inscription: The glass windows come from the chapel in Waldfried. Carl von Weinberg donated them in memory of his wife May (née Forbes).

After the expropriation of his property, Carl von Weinberg, widowed since 1937, went into exile to live with his sister and her family in Italy. His sister was married to Count Paolozzi of Chiusi. On March 14, 1943, he died near Florence, six days before his brother Arthur died in the Theresienstadt Ghetto. Carl von Weinberg was buried in the cemetery of Chiusi, in the grave of his sister's family.

== Awards ==
- In 1927, Weinberg was awarded an honorary doctorate by the Goethe University of Frankfurt. In 1928, he was awarded the silver plaque of the city of Frankfurt.

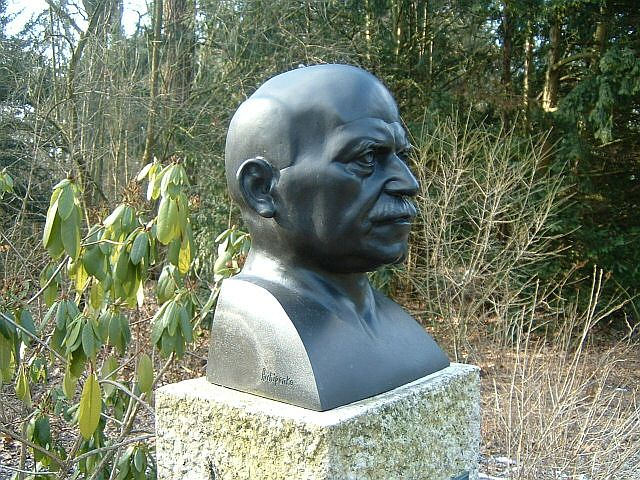
Bust of Weinberg at the entrance to the play park of the same name in Niederrad

- After 1945, all name changes were reversed. In addition to the Carl von Weinberg School and Carl von Weinberg Street in Frankfurt's West End, a park with his bust on the grounds of the former Villa Waldfried in Frankfurt-Niederrad commemorates the patron and supporter of Frankfurt

== Literature ==
- Ernst Mack: Die Frankfurter Familie von Weinberg. Im Zeichen der Kornblumenblüten. Heimat- und Geschichtsverein Schwanheim e. V., Schwanheim 2000, ISBN 3-921606-55-1.
- Angela von Gans, Monika Groening: Die Familie Gans 1350-1963. Verlag Regionalkultur, Heidelberg 2006, ISBN 3-89735-486-1.
- Helene von Schauroth (Hrsg.): Lina v. Schauroth. Eine Frankfurter Künstlerin. Verlag Waldemar Kramer, Frankfurt am Main 1984, ISBN 3-7829-0291-2.
- Hansjörg W. Vollmann: Cassella und ihre Eigentümer. Große Frankfurter Mäzene. Vortrag im Rahmen der Reihe „Mäzene, Stifter, Stadtkultur“ der Frankfurter Bürgerstiftung am Mittwoch, 23. Januar 2013, 19.30 Uhr, Veranstaltungsort: Haus am Dom, Frankfurt, Bad Soden am Taunus, 23. Januar 2013, Vortrag als PDF, retrieved: 3.
- Mirco Overländer (2013-11-09). "Familie von Weinberg Frankfurt. Verfolgt, verfemt, doch nicht vergessen". Frankfurter Neue Presse. Archived from the original on 2015-06-21.

== Enternal links ==
- Literature by and about Carl von Weinberg in the German National Library catalogue
- Carl von Weinberg im Portal Frankfurt 1933 bis 1945
- Homepage der Carl-von-Weinberg-Schule
- Bild von May von Weinberg
- Carl von Weinberg bei wollheim-memorial.de
- May von Weinberg (1866-1927) einschließlich ihrer Porträtbüste vom Bildhauer Alexander Archipenko (1887-1967) auf frankfurterfrauenzimmer.de
