= Berlin glass amphora from Olbia =

Coordinates: 52.5194°N 13.3983°E

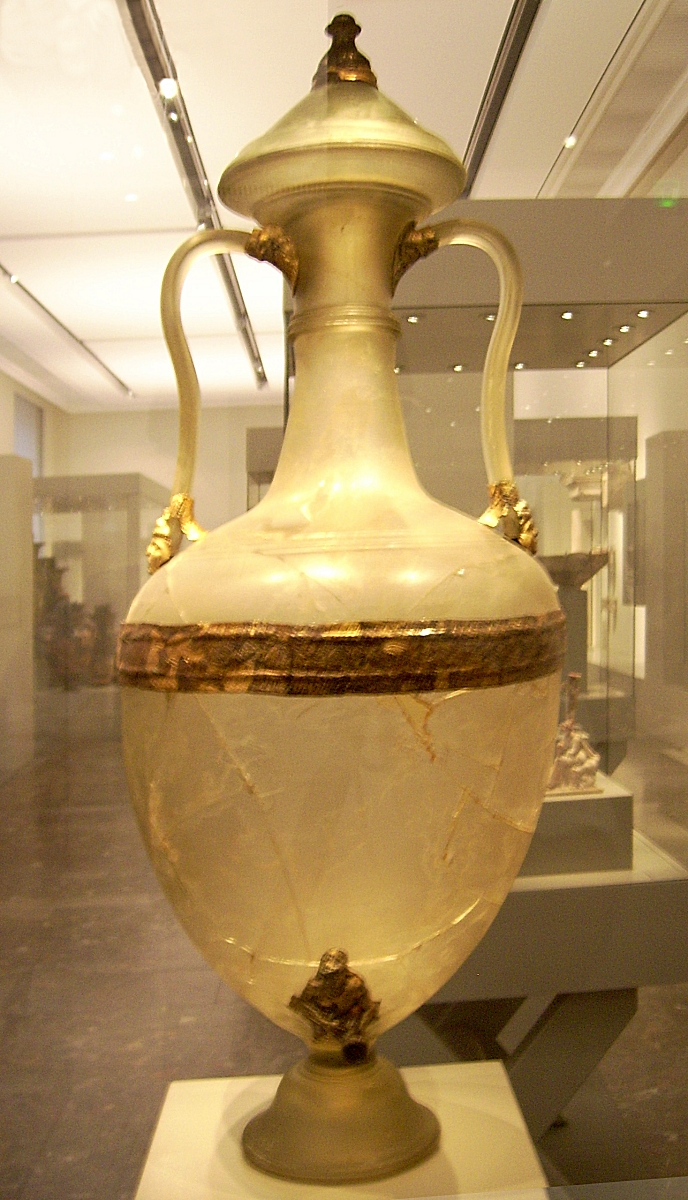
The amphora from one side

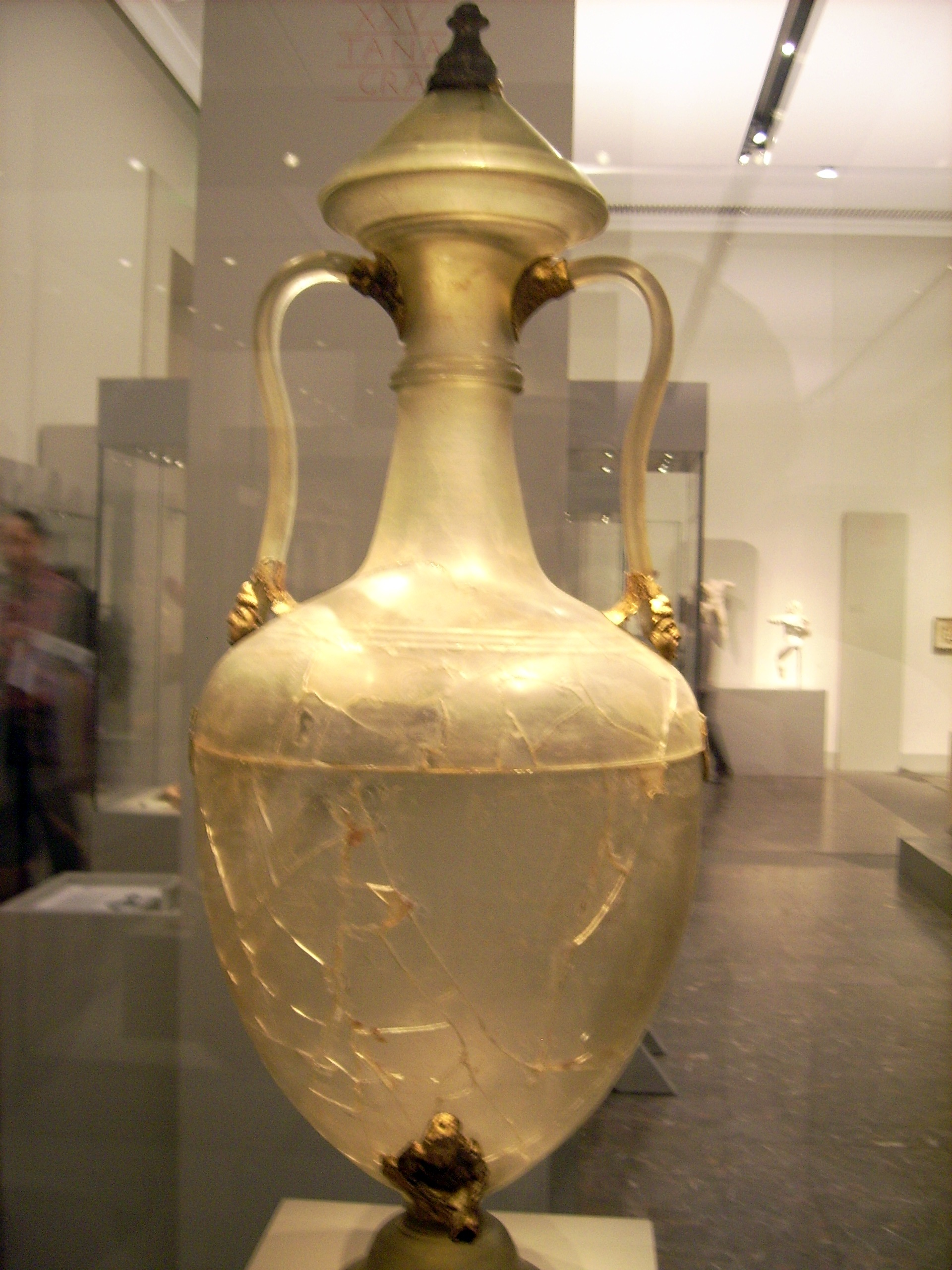
The amphora from the other side

The Berlin glass amphora from Olbia (German: Berliner Glasamphora aus Olbia) is a Hellenistic glass vessel in the shape of an amphora, which is now kept in the Antikensammlung Berlin. Presumably the glass amphora was commissioned by a rich citizen of the city of Olbia, where it was later found, in the second half of the second century. The uniquely shaped vessel was donated to the collection, with some other glass vessels, by Friedrich Ludwig von Gans in 1912 and is now displayed in the Altes Museum with the inventory number 30219, 254. It is, to date, the largest known piece of its kind - and one of the best preserved.

== Description ==
The amphora is a masterpiece of Hellenistic glasswork. It is 59.6cm high and therefore the largest glass vessel from Antiquity. It is entirely free of air pockets. Nowadays the glass is milky and light yellow due to centuries of ultraviolet radiation from the Sun, but originally it was clear and had a pale green tinge. With its cap, it is 2.445 kg in weight and it has a diameter of 9.6 cm at the cap and 22.4 cm at the belly. The cap is not the original, which was probably broken and replaced by this new, slightly overlapping, conical cap of clear, rather yellowish glass. Because of the complicated manufacturing process there is a shift in the axis between the foot and the cap.

Below the belly on both sides, holes have been drilled. In these holes, taps have been fitted in the shape of satyrs, holding animal bladders, from which the liquid in the amphora could flow out. They, like the decorative bands and other decorative elements (the knob on the cap or the sleeves which cover the join between the handles and the amphora) are made of gilt copper sheet. The sleeves for the handles are in the shape of masks and maple scrolls. The shape imitates the Panathenaic amphora, which were manufactured in this form in the third and second centuries BC in Athens. It must have had the appearance of quartz, especially when used during feasts in the glow of artificial light.

== Manufacture ==
Since the technique of glassblowing had not yet been invented, its creation was a complicated process. The vase was made from two pieces: the widely flaring belly on a high foot, and the shoulder with a long neck and flaring mouth. These two pieces fit together exactly. The join is covered by a gilt copper strip decorated with vine patterns. Only one side of this strip survives, however. The two parts were made in turn. The belly, whose walls are very thin, was either cast in a mould or pressed onto a mould. The bell-shaped foot was produced similarly, which was then hot joined to the belly piece using a solid stick. The other portion was made in the same way. The shoulder and a portion of the neck were either cast in a mould or lowered onto a template while hot. The rest of the neck and the mouth were melted together with a hot stick, just as the foot and belly were. Because of the bulge, the join can easily be spotted.

== Bibliography ==
- Gertrud Platz-Horster. "Die Berliner Glasamphora aus Olbia." Journal of Glass Studies. Vol. 37, 1995, ISSN 0075-4250, pp. 35–50.
- Gertrud Platz-Horster. "Die Glasamphora aus Olbia." In Andreas Scholl, Gertrud Platz-Horster (ed.): Die Antikensammlung. Altes Museum. Pergamonmuseum. 3rd completely revised edition. von Zabern, Mainz 2007, ISBN 978-3-8053-2449-6, pp. 107-108.
