= Arthur von Weinberg =

German chemist (1860–1943)

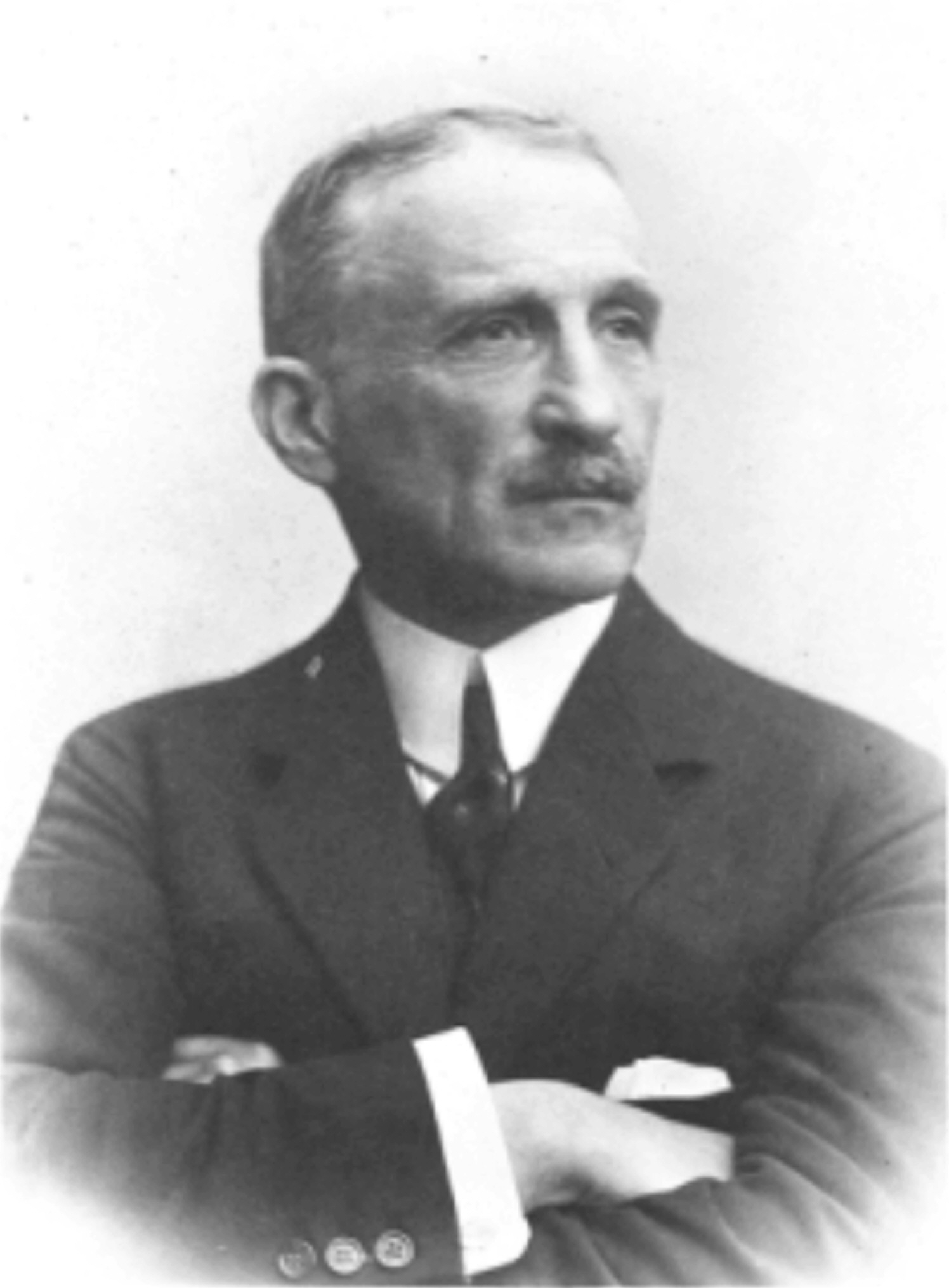
Arthur von Weinberg

Arthur von Weinberg (11 August 1860, in Frankfurt am Main – 20 March 1943, in the Theresienstadt Ghetto) was a German chemist and industrialist.

He was a co-owner of Cassella and later a co-founder, co-owner and member of the supervisory board and the administrative board of IG Farben. He was also a prominent philanthropist in Frankfurt. He founded the Arthur von Weinberg Foundation in 1909, was director of the Senckenberg Nature Research Society and was a co-founder of the Goethe University Frankfurt in 1914.

A member of a Jewish family of industrialists, he was a grandson of Ludwig Aaron Gans. In 1908 Arthur Weinberg and his brother Carl were ennobled by Emperor William II, and he received numerous other honours in Germany. In 1909 he married the Dutch widow Willemine Huygens. During the Nazi regime, Weinberg was forced out of his offices and for a time lived with his adopted daughters Marie and Charlotte, Countess Spreti in Bavaria. In 1942 he was arrested, and he died following a cholecystectomy in the Theresienstadt Ghetto at the age of 82. His ashes were scattered in the Eger river.

== Honours ==
- Raised to the hereditary German nobility by Emperor William II (1908)
- Privy Councillor (1913)
- Honorary doctorate (Dr. med. h.c.) and honorary senator of the Goethe University Frankfurt
- Honorary doctorate (Dr.-Ing. E.h.) of the Technical University of Darmstadt
- Honorary doctorate (Dr.-Ing. h.c.) of the Charles-Ferdinand University
- Honorary citizen of Fechenheim
- Honorary citizen of Frankfurt am Main (1930)
- Honorary Plaque of Frankfurt am Main in Silver
- Goethe Medal for Art and Science
- Grand Cross of the Order of the Crown of Italy
- Medaglie ai Benemeriti della salute pubblica
- Honorary President of the Senckenberg Nature Research Society
- Fellow of the Academy of Sciences Leopoldina
- Iron Cross 2nd and 1st class
- Military Merit Order (Bavaria) 4th class with crown and swords
- The Honour Cross of the World War 1914/1918 (Frontkämpferkreuz)
- Order of the Red Eagle 4th class
- Order of St. Michael (Bavaria) 4th class
- Honorary member of the Kyffhäuserbund
- Prince-Regent Luitpold Medal

The Arthur von Weinberg Bridge between Fechenheim and Offenbach-Bürgel, the Arthur von Weinberg Street in Frankfurt-Kalbach-Riedberg and the Arthur von Weinberg Park in Frankfurt-Niederrad are named in his honour.
