= Old Jewish Cemetery, Frankfurt =

Cemetery in Frankfurt, Germany

Coordinates: 50°07′56″N 8°41′22″E

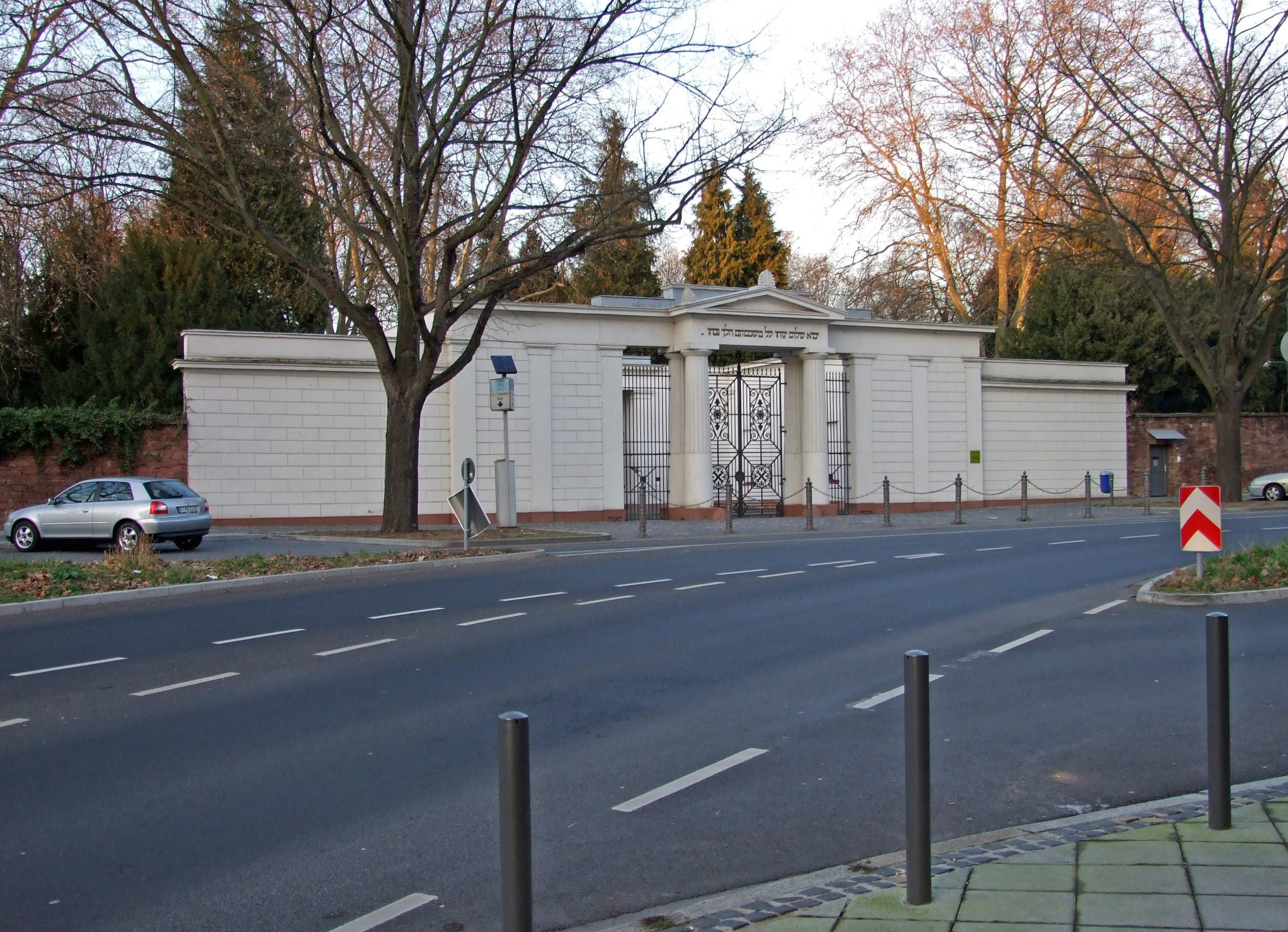
Main portal of the Old Jewish Cemetery

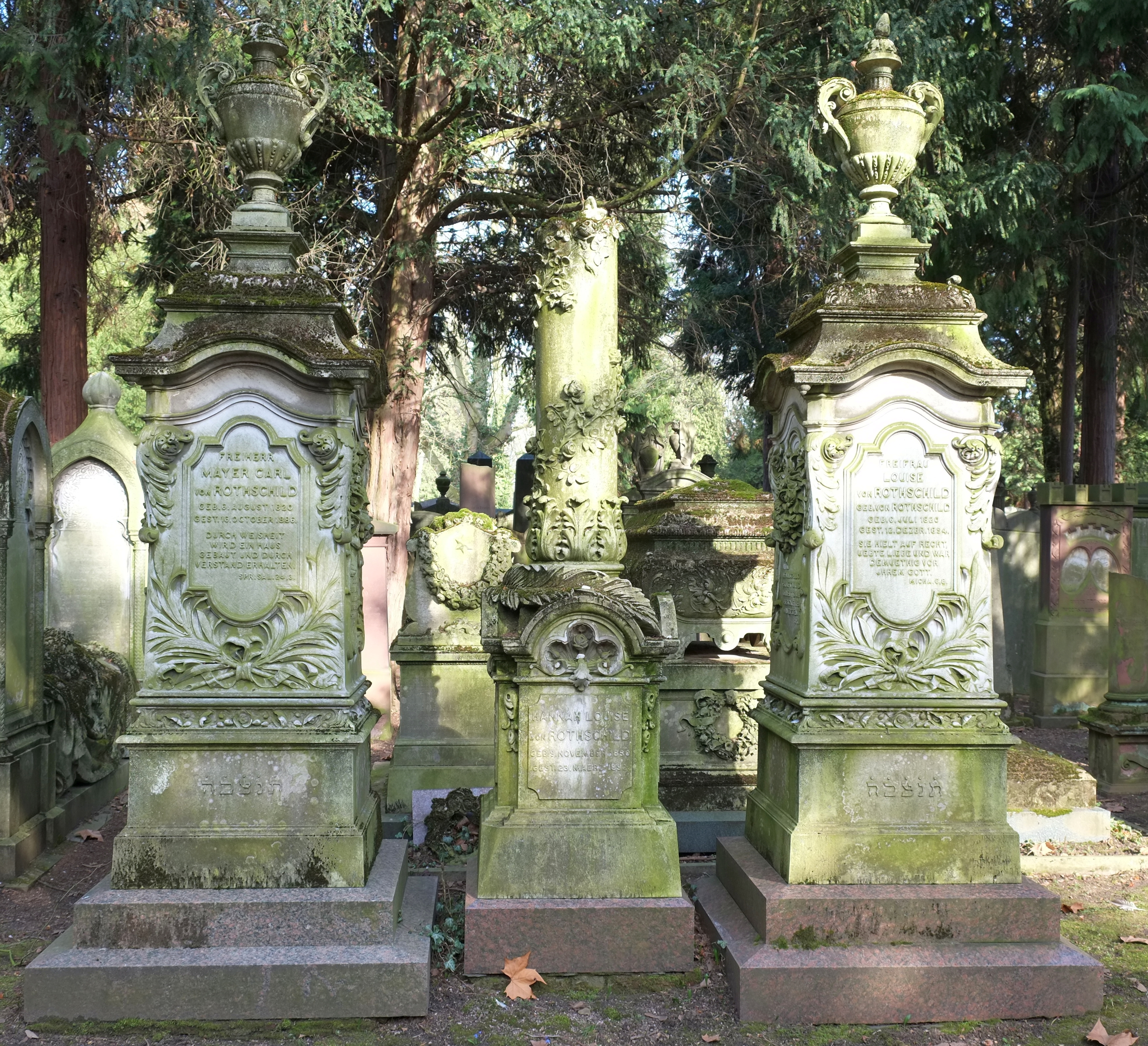
Grave of Louise and Mayer Carl von Rothschild

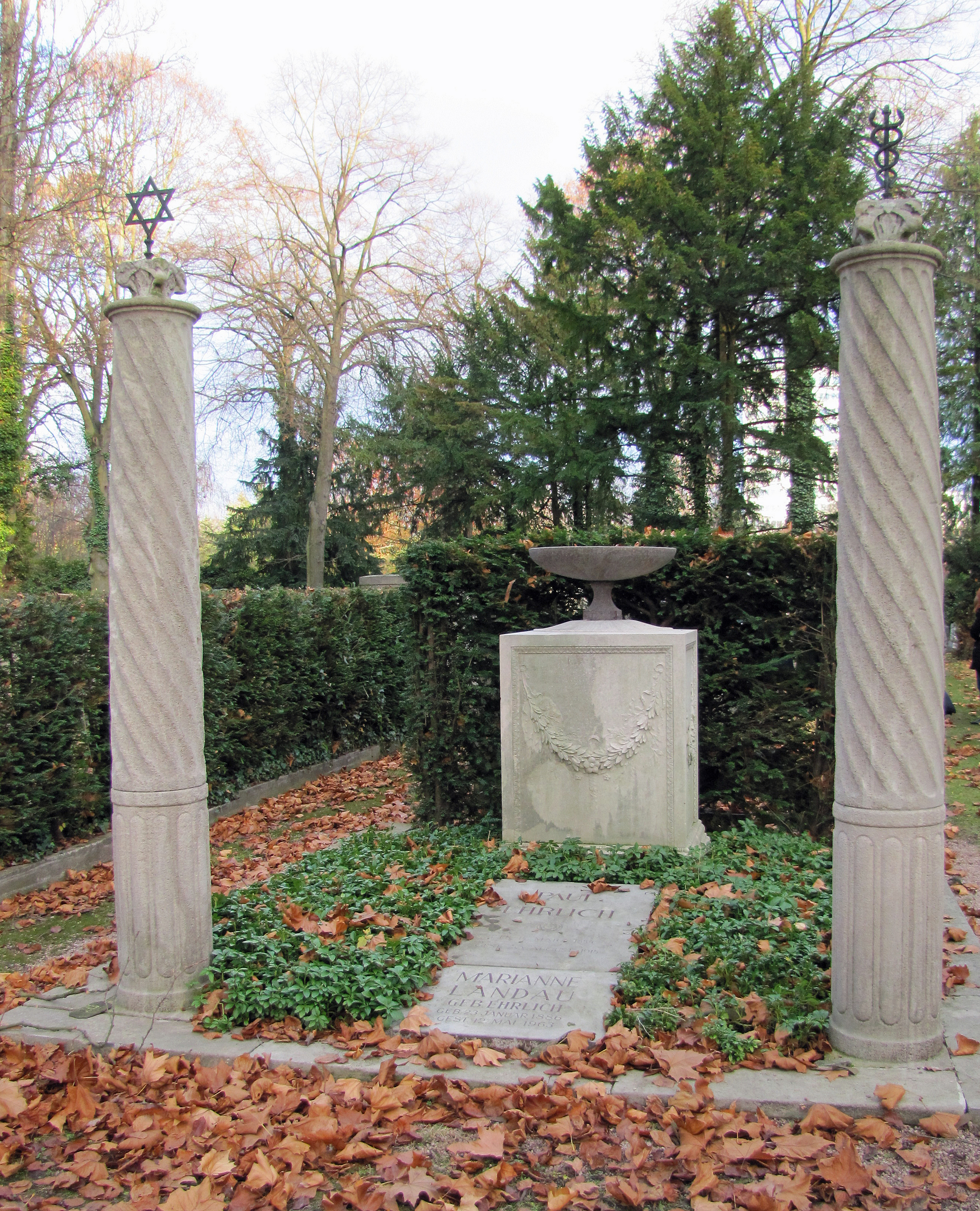
Grave of the Nobel laureate Paul Ehrlich

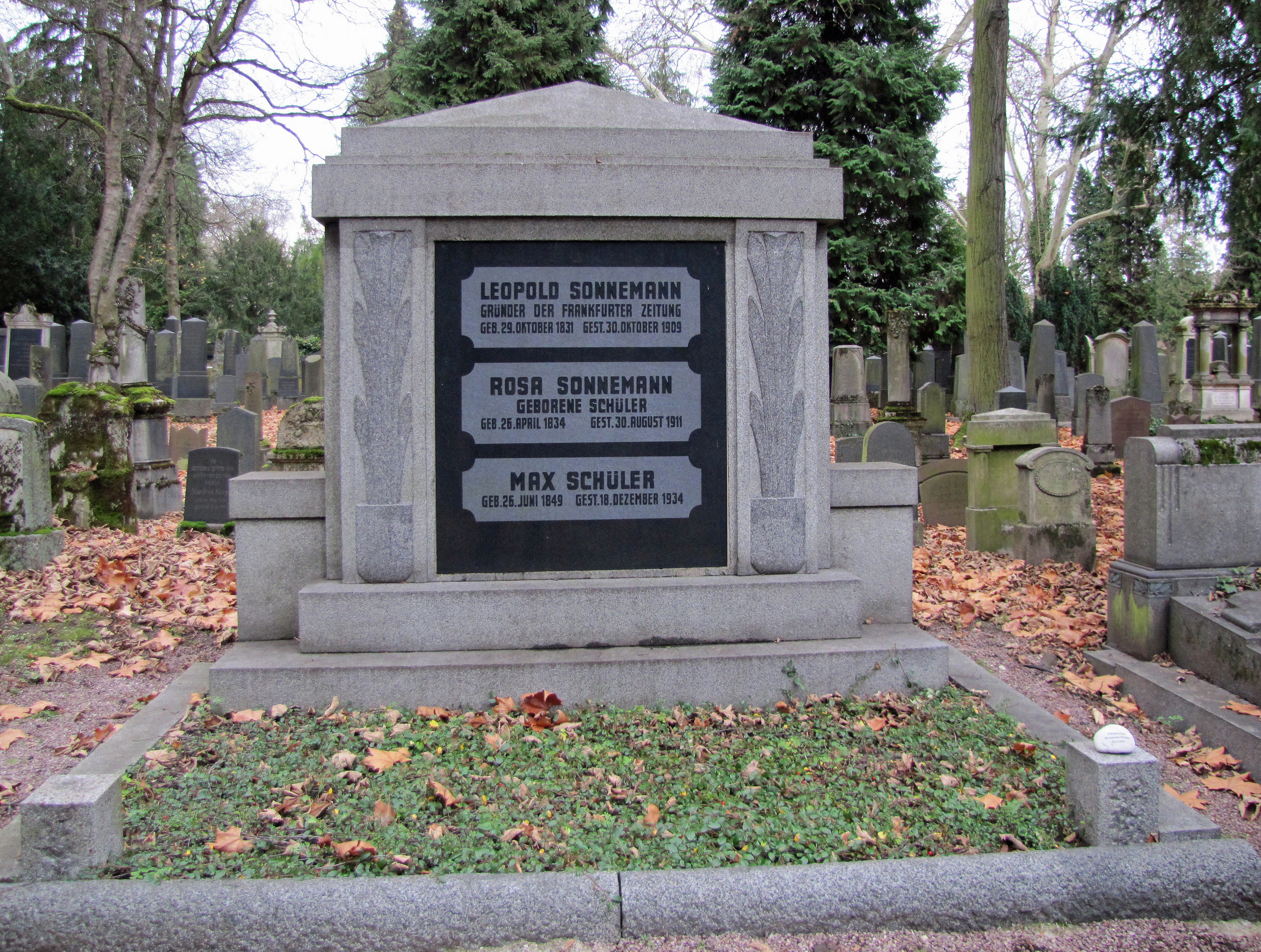
Grave of the publisher Leopold Sonnemann

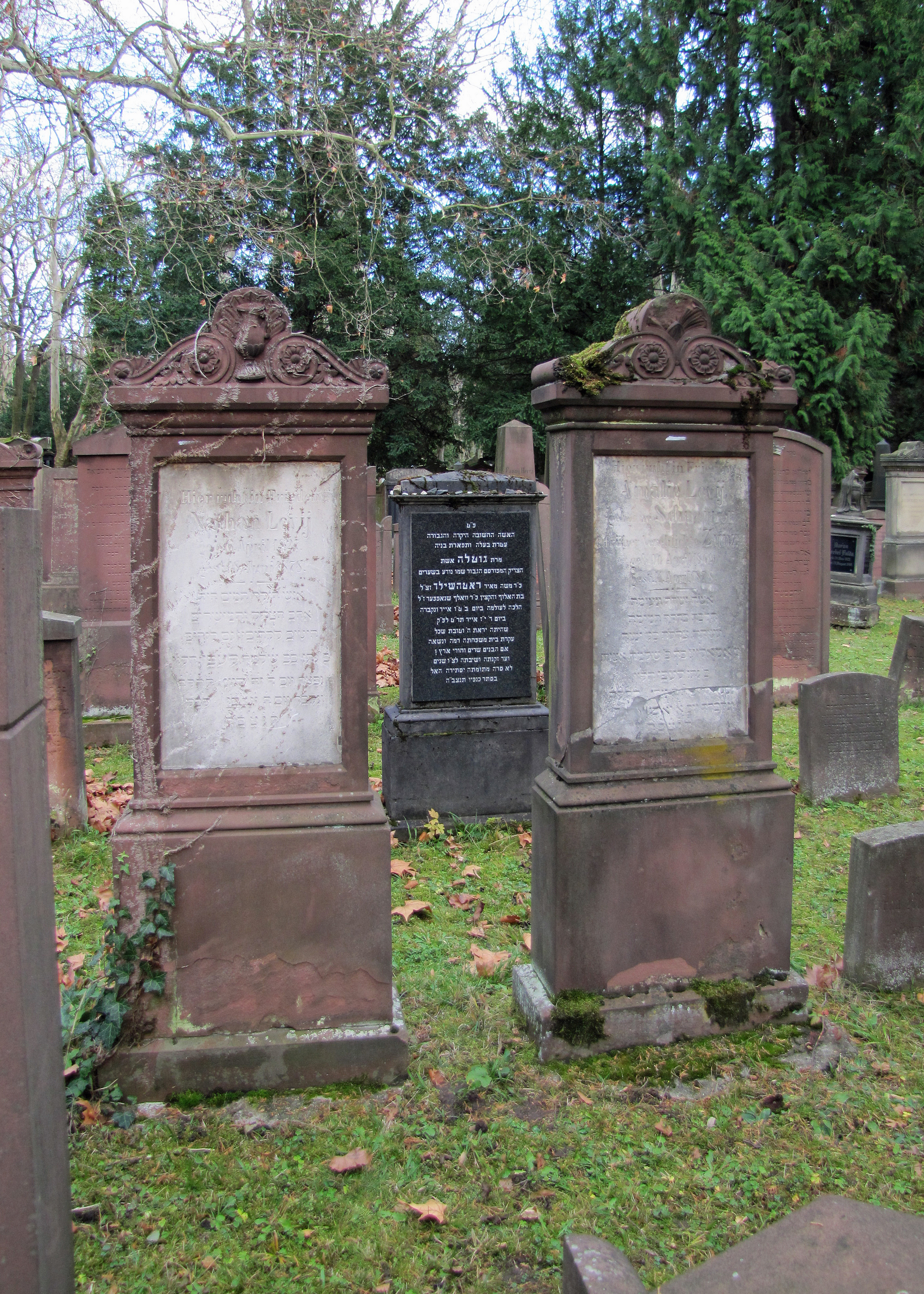
Grave of Gutle Rothschild (1753–1849), wife of Mayer Amschel Rothschild, founder of the Rothschild banking family

The Old Jewish Cemetery (German: Alter jüdischer Friedhof) of Frankfurt, Germany, is located at Rat-Beil-Straße ("Councillor Beil Street") directly adjacent to the oldest parts of the gentile Frankfurt Main Cemetery. Together, Frankfurt Main Cemetery, the Old Jewish Cemetery, and the New Jewish Cemetery constitute one of the largest cemetery areas in Germany. The Old Jewish Cemetery is noted for many monumental graves and includes the graves of many notable individuals. The Old Jewish Cemetery is the largest of Frankfurt's twelve Jewish cemeteries.

It was opened, together with the Main Cemetery, in 1828. By 1928, when the cemetery was closed for new graves because it was full, there were around 40,000 burials on the cemetery. Since 1928, interment has only been possible in already established (family) graves. In its place, the New Jewish Cemetery was opened in 1928.

== Notable graves ==
- Salomon Breuer (1850–1926), rabbi
- Emma Budge (1852–1937), art collector and philanthropist
- Leopold Cassella (1766–1847), businessman and founder of Cassella
- Paul Ehrlich (1854–1915), Nobel Prize laureate in medicine (block 114 N)
- Ludwig Aaron Gans (1794–1871), businessman and owner of Cassella
- Charles Hallgarten (1838–1908), banker and social reformer
- Samson Raphael Hirsch (1808–1888), rabbi
- Markus Horovitz (1844–1910), rabbi
- Joseph Johlson (1777–1851), reform pedagogue and religious scholar
- Isaac Löw Königswarter (1818–1877), banker
- Isidor Kracauer (1852–1923), historian
- Nehemia Anton Nobel (1871–1922), rabbi
- Moritz Daniel Oppenheim (1800–1882), painter
- Bertha Pappenheim (1859–1936), women's rights pioneer
- Saul Pinchas Rabbinowicz (1845–1910), author
- Amschel Mayer von Rothschild (1773–1855), banker and philanthropist
- Gutle Rothschild (1753–1849), wife of Mayer Amschel Rothschild, founder of the Rothschild banking family
- Hannah Luise von Rothschild (1850–1892), philanthropist
- Louise von Rothschild (1820–1894), philanthropist
- Mathilde von Rothschild (1832–1924), philanthropist
- Mayer Carl von Rothschild (1820–1886), banker and politician
- Wilhelm Carl von Rothschild (1828–1901), banker and politician
- Edward Salomon (1828–1909), 8th governor of Wisconsin
- Heinrich Schwarzschild (1803–1878), physician and poet
- Max Seckbach (1866–1922), architect
- Leopold Sonnemann (1831–1909), publisher and founder of Frankfurter Zeitung
- Georg Speyer (1835–1902), banker
- Theodor Stern (1937–1900), banker and politician
- Israel von Stolin (1869–1921), rabbi
- Karl Weigert (1845–1904), pathologist

== Literature ==
- Victor von Brauchitsch, Helga von Brauchitsch: Zum Gedenken – Grabmale in Frankfurt am Main. Kramer, Frankfurt am Main 1988, ISBN 3-7829-0354-4.
- Peter Braunholz, Britta Boerdner, Christian Setzepfandt: Der Frankfurter Hauptfriedhof. Bildband. Societäts-Verlag, Frankfurt am Main 2009, ISBN 978-3-7973-1147-4.
- Isidor Kracauer: Geschichte der Juden in Frankfurt a. M. (1150–1824). 2 vols., J. Kauffmann, Frankfurt am Main 1925/27.
- Eugen Mayer: Die Frankfurter Juden. Blicke in die Vergangenheit. Verlag Waldemar Kramer, Frankfurt am Main 1966.
- Valentin Senger, Klaus Meier-Ude: Die jüdischen Friedhöfe in Frankfurt am Main. Fachhochschulverlag, Frankfurt am Main 2004, ISBN 3-936065-15-2, pp. 10–20
