= Heinz Gibian =

German biochemist

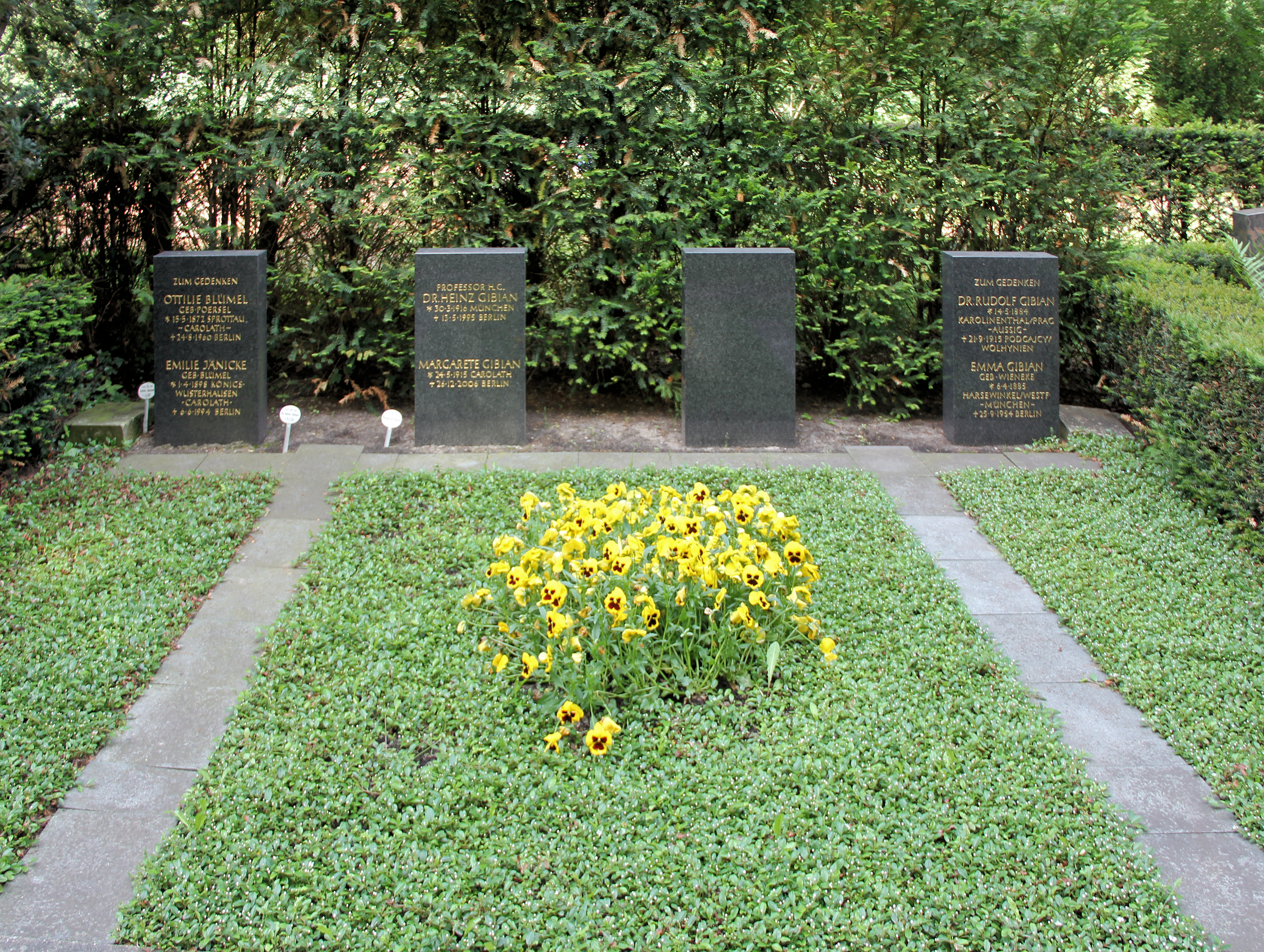
Grave

Heinz Rudolf Gibian (30 March 1916 – 13 May 1995) was a German biochemist, who was noted for his research on steroid hormones.

He was a senior researcher at the drug research department of Schering AG and was later a member of the company's senior management. He was also an honorary Professor of biochemistry at the Free University of Berlin.

Gibian was born in Munich. He earned his Doktoringenieur degree at the Technical University of Munich, where he was a student of the Nobel laureate Hans Fischer. He was also a board member of the Society for Biochemistry and Molecular Biology. He died in Berlin, aged 79.
