= Werner Zerweck =

German chemist (1899–1965)

- Born: 14 March 1899; Munich, Germany
- Died: 10 September 1965 (aged 66); Frankfurt, Germany
- Education: Technical University of Munich
- Awards: Order of Merit of the Federal Republic of Germany (1953)
- Scientific career
- Fields: Chemistry
- Workplaces: Cassella (1924–1963)
- Doctoral advisor: Hans Fischer

Werner Zerweck (14 March 1899 in Munich – 10 September 1965) was a German chemist, inventor and industrial leader, who was CEO of the chemical and pharmaceutical company Cassella (later merged with Sanofi) from 1953 to 1963. Under his leadership, the company shifted its primary focus from dyes to pharmaceuticals and cosmetics. He was also a member of the advisory board of Deutsche Bank from 1953. Zerweck was a pioneer in the development of synthetic fibers.

== Career ==
Zerweck studied chemistry at the Technical University of Munich under the Nobel Prize-winning chemists Heinrich Otto Wieland and Hans Fischer, and obtained his doctorate in 1922 with Fischer as his doctoral advisor. He then worked for two years as Fischer's assistant, and was employed as a researcher at Cassella from 1924 after being recommended to the company by Fischer. He worked in the research laboratory led by Arthur von Weinberg and later worked closely with Richard Herz. In 1932 he became joint head of research together with Otto Bayer; after Otto Bayer had left Cassella to join Bayer the following year, Zerweck became Cassella's sole head of research. He received power of procuration in 1936 and became deputy head of the Cassella works in 1939. He was vice chairman of the board of directors (i.e. deputy CEO) from 1947 and chairman of the board of directors (i.e. CEO) of Cassella from 1953, and simultaneously continued to head its research activities. He was also a member of the supervisory board from 1956. He retired as CEO on 31 December 1963.

In 1950, he became Honorary Professor of chemical engineering at the University of Erlangen-Nuremberg. He became a member of the advisory board of Deutsche Bank in 1953.

The Prof. Dr. Zerweck/Cassella Foundation (Prof. Dr. Zerweck-/Cassella-Stiftung) was established in 1966 and named in his honour. He was the (co-)inventor of numerous chemical and pharmaceutical patents.

== Honours ==
- Order of Merit of the Federal Republic of Germany (1953)

== Selected publications ==
- Hans Fischer, Werner Zerweck, "Über den Harnfarbstoff bei normalen und pathologischen Verhältnissen und seine lichtschützende Wirkung. Zugleich einige Beiträge zur Kenntnis der Porphyrinurie," Hoppe-Seyler's Zeitschrift für physiologische Chemie (= Biological Chemistry). Volume 137, Issue 3–6, Pages 176–241, doi:10.1515/bchm2.1924.137.3-6.176
- Hans Fischer, Werner Zerweck, "Zur Kenntnis der natürlichen Porphyrine. 7. Mitteilung. Über Uroporphyrinogen-heptamethylester und eine neue Überführung von Uro- in Koproporphyrin," Hoppe-Seyler's Zeitschrift für physiologische Chemie (= Biological Chemistry). Volume 137, Issue 3–6, Pages 242–264, doi:10.1515/bchm2.1924.137.3-6.242
- Hans Fischer, Werner Zerweck, "Zur Kenntnis der Pyrrole, 1. Mitteilung: Über Pyrrol-aldehyde", Berichte der deutschen chemischen Gesellschaft, Volume 55, Issue 6, pages 1942–1949, 1922, doi:10.1002/cber.19220550645
- Hans Fischer, Werner Zerweck, "Zur Kenntnis der Pyrrole, 2. Mitteilung: Nitrierung von substituierten Pyrrolen". Berichte der deutschen chemischen Gesellschaft, Volume 55, Issue 6, pages 1949–1955, 1922, doi:10.1002/cber.19220550646
- Hans Fischer, Werner Zerweck, "Zur Kenntnis der Pyrrole, 4. Mitteilung: Über Pyrrol-aldehyde (II.) und über Pyrrol-nitrile," Berichte der deutschen chemischen Gesellschaft, Volume 56, Issue 2, pages 519–527, 1923, doi:10.1002/cber.19230560219
- Hans Fischer, Karl Schneller, Werner Zerweck, "Zur Kenntnis der Pyrrole, 3. Mitteilung: Über Ketone, Ketonsäure-ester und Ketonsäure-nitrile substituierter Pyrrole," Berichte der deutschen chemischen Gesellschaft, Volume 55, Issue 8, pages 2390–2403, 1922, doi:10.1002/cber.19220550818
