= Richard von Szilvinyi =

German industrialist

Richard von Szilvinyi (born 16 October 1899 in Vienna, died 28 April 1966 in Frankfurt) was a German industrialist.

He was a son of the Austro-Hungarian Field Marshal Lieutenant Géza von Szilvinyi and a member of a Catholic Austro-Hungarian noble family. In 1929, he married Wera Maud Helene Katharina von Weinberg, daughter of the industrialist Carl von Weinberg and Ethel Mary Villers Forbes. His wife's family was a prominent Jewish family of industrialists from Frankfurt who owned Cassella and who had co-founded IG Farben. In 1929 he moved to Frankfurt and started working for IG Farben, where the Weinbergs had a substantial interest. From 1945 to 1952 he was leader of the Cassella works, and he became chairman of the supervisory board in 1952. He was also chairman of the supervisory board of the Frankfurter Bank from 1952.

In his second marriage he was married to Liselotte (Lilo) von Schnitzler, daughter of Georg von Schnitzler.

== Honours ==
- Honorary Plaque of the City of Frankfurt (1959)
