= Gans family =

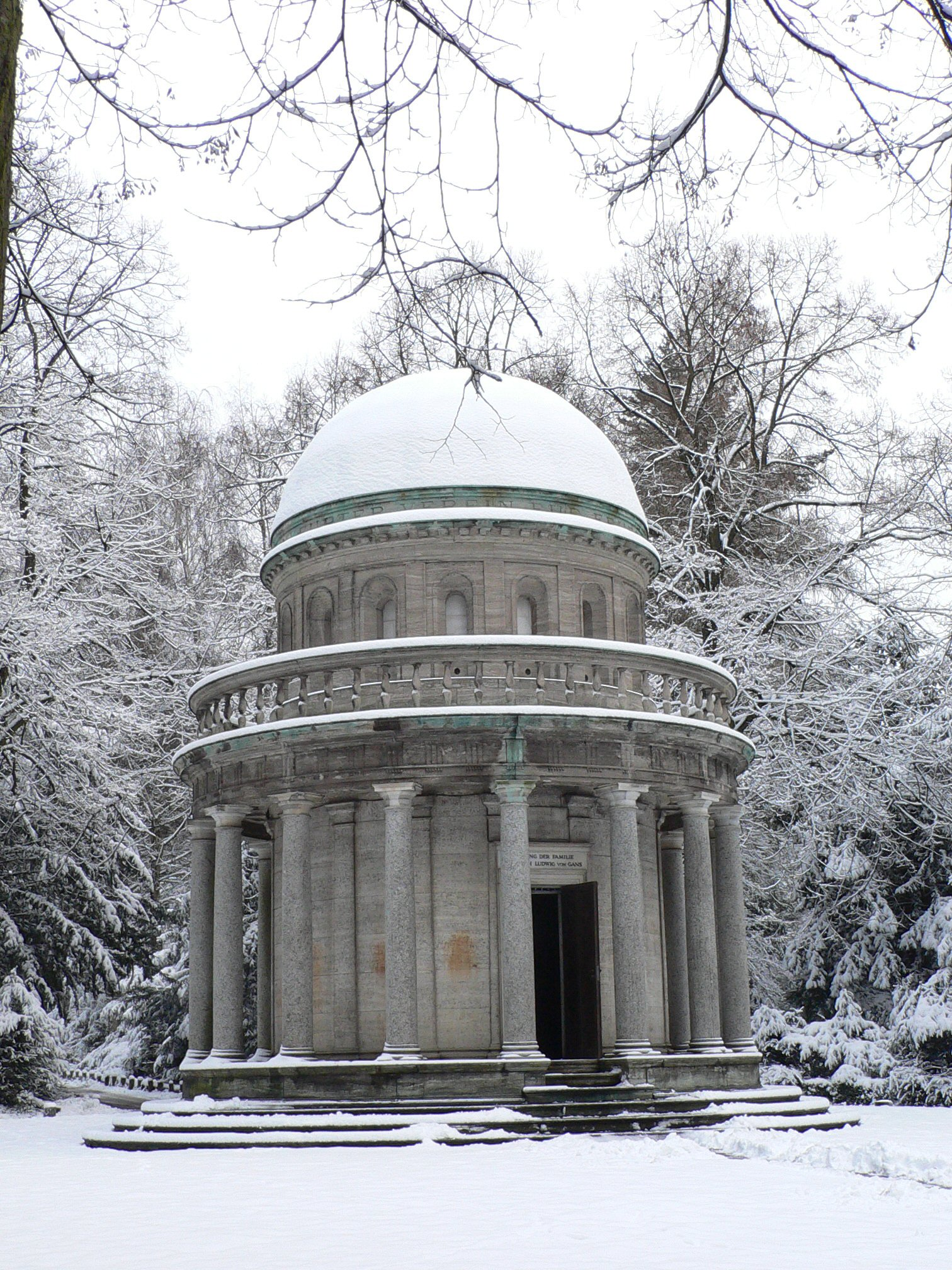
The Gans family mausoleum at the Frankfurt Main Cemetery

The Gans family is a prominent German family of industrialists and philanthropists from Frankfurt am Main. It is descended from Ludwig Aaron Gans, a Jewish businessman from Celle, who became an apprentice in the firm Caßel & Reiß in Frankfurt in 1814. In 1828, he married Rosette Goldschmidt (1805–1868), a niece and adopted daughter of the firm's owner Leopold Cassella, and was accepted as a partner of the firm. In 1848, Gans became sole owner of Leopold Cassella & Co., as the company was then named. Ludwig Aaron Gans was the father of the major industrialist Friedrich Ludwig von Gans, who was ennobled in 1912, and of the chemist and industrialist Leo Gans. The family converted from Judaism to Protestantism in the late 19th century.

== Literature ==
- Angela von Gans, Monika Groening: Die Familie Gans 1350–1963. Verlag Regionalkultur, Heidelberg, 2006, ISBN 978-3-89735-486-9
- Monika Groening: Leo Gans und Arthur von Weinberg. Mäzenatentum und jüdische Emanzipation (Biographiereihe der Goethe Universität: Gründer, Gönner und Gelehrte), Societätsverlag Frankfurt am Main 2012, ISBN 978-3-942921-86-2.
