= Hans Fischer =

German chemist (1881–1945)

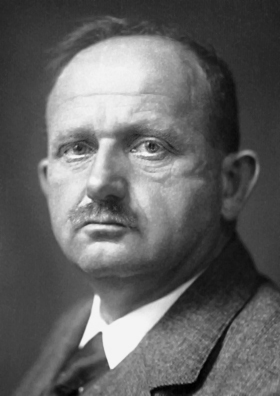
- Fischer in 1930
- Born: 27 July 1881; Höchst on Main, Hesse-Nassau, Kingdom of Prussia, German Empire
- Died: 31 March 1945 (aged 63); Munich, Gau Munich-Upper Bavaria, Nazi Germany
- Education: University of Lausanne; Marburg University
- Known for: Chlorophyll; Haemin; Fischer–Fink synthesis
- Awards: Liebig Medal (1929); Nobel Prize for Chemistry (1930); Davy Medal (1937)
- Scientific career
- Fields: Chemistry
- Workplaces: University of Innsbruck, University of Vienna, Technical University of Munich
- Doctoral advisor: Theodor Zincke
- Other academic advisors: Emil Fischer
- Doctoral students: Alfred E. Treibs; Werner Zerweck; Costin Nenițescu; Adolf Stachel; Heinz Gibian

Hans Fischer (German pronunciation: [ˈhans ˈfɪʃɐ]; 27 July 1881 – 31 March 1945) was a German organic chemist and the recipient of the 1930 Nobel Prize for Chemistry "for his researches into the constitution of haemin and chlorophyll and especially for his synthesis of haemin."

== Biography ==
=== Early years ===
Fischer was born on July 27, 1881, in Höchst, now a city district of Frankfurt located in Germany. His parents were Dr. Eugen Fischer, Director of the firm of Kalle & Co., Wiesbaden, and Privatdozent at the Technische Hochschule Stuttgart, and Anna Herdegen was his mother. He went to a primary school in Stuttgart, and later to the "Humanistisches Gymnasium" in Wiesbaden, matriculating in 1899. He read chemistry and medicine, first at the University of Lausanne and then at Marburg University. He graduated in 1904 and obtained his chemistry degree. Two years later in 1906, he licensed for medicine, and in 1908, he qualified for his M.D. with which he applied to the Ludwig-Maximilians-Universität München.

=== Career ===
He worked first at a Medical Clinic in Munich and then at the First Berlin Chemical Institute under Emil Fischer. He returned to the Ludwig-Maximilians-Universität München in 1911 and qualified as lecturer on internal medicine one year later. In 1913, he became a lecturer in physiology at the Physiological Institute of the Ludwig-Maximilians-Universität München. In 1916, he became Professor of Medical Chemistry at the University of Innsbruck and from there he went to the University of Vienna in 1918.

Then, from 1921 until his death, he held the position of Professor of Organic Chemistry at the Technical University of Munich.

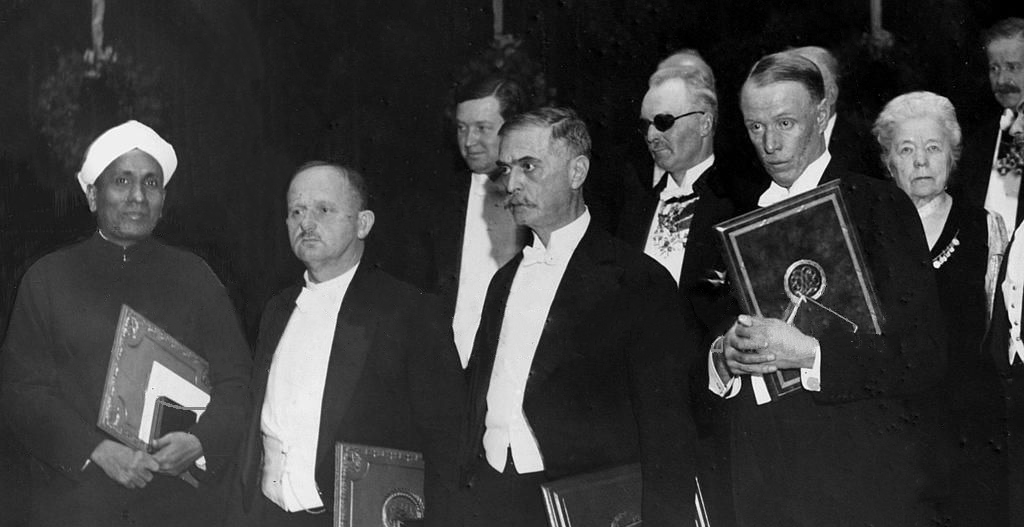
Nobel Award Ceremony

Fischer's scientific work was mostly concerned with the investigation of the pigments in blood, bile, and also chlorophyll in leaves, as well as with the chemistry of pyrrole from which these pigments are derived. Of special importance was his synthesis of bilirubin and haemin. He received many honors for this work, and received the Nobel Prize in 1930. The lunar crater Fischer was named after him (and Hermann Emil Fischer) in 1976. Hans Fisher had mapped the composition of a heme group. In 1929, Fischer succeeded in producing the substance and proving that its ring has a central atom of iron, as he also continued studying other pigmented substances of a biological importance of biochemistry such as chlorophyll, the color that plays part in a plants photosynthesis. Fischer also unraveled the bile pigments biliverdin (which causes the yellowish color characteristic of bruised skin) and bilirubin (which yellows skin in jaundice cases), and synthesized them in 1942 and 1944, successively. He conducted microanalyses of more than 60,000 chemical substance, and had won the Nobel Prize for Chemistry in 1930. The person that sparked Fischer's interest was von Muller, his former professor and supervisor whom interests were in pyrrole pigments by inviting Fischer to work with him at the well-known Second Medical Clinic in Munich in 1910. Under Muller, he began to examine the composition of the bile pigment bilirubin, something he would continue to be engaged in during the decades that followed. Fischer's succession also came with difficulty's as many of his experiments seemed to have failed but with time Fischer was able to perfect his acknowledgement with his failed attempts.

=== Personal life ===
Fischer married Wiltrud Haufe around his 50s in the year 1935. Fischer was a man who was dedicated almost "exclusively" to his work. He continued his scientific research during Germany's Nazi era, and committed suicide on Easter Sunday in 1945, after his laboratory and life's work had been destroyed by the bombing of Munich in the last days of World War II.

== Honours ==
- Fellow of the Academy of Sciences Leopoldina (1919)
- Privy Councillor (1925)
- Liebig Memorial Medal (1929)
- Nobel Prize for Chemistry (1930)
- Honorary doctorate, Harvard University (1936)
- Davy Medal of the Royal Society of London (1937)

== Literature ==
- Heinrich Wieland (1950), "Hans Fischer und Otto Hönigschmid zum Gedächtniss", Angewandte Chemie, 62 (1): 1–4, Bibcode:1950AngCh..62....1W, doi:10.1002/ange.19500620102.
- Bickel, M H (2001), "[Henry E. Sigerist and Hans Fischer as pioneers of a medical history institute in Zurich]", Gesnerus, vol. 58, no. 3–4, pp. 215–9, PMID 11810971
- Stern, A J (1973), "Hans Fischer (1881–1945)", Ann. N. Y. Acad. Sci., vol. 206, no. 1, pp. 752–61, Bibcode:1973NYASA.206..752S, doi:10.1111/j.1749-6632.1973.tb43252.x, PMID 4584221, S2CID 40633114
- Watson, C J (1965), "Reminiscences of Hans Fischer and his laboratory", Perspect. Biol. Med., vol. 8, no. 4, pp. 419–35, doi:10.1353/pbm.1965.0052, PMID 5323649, S2CID 32016198
- Kämmerer, H (1961), "Hans Fischer (1881–1945). A reminiscence on the 80th anniversary of his birth", Münchener Medizinische Wochenschrift (1950), vol. 103 (published Nov 3, 1961), pp. 2164–6, PMID 14036988
