= Ludwig Aaron Gans =

German entrepreneur

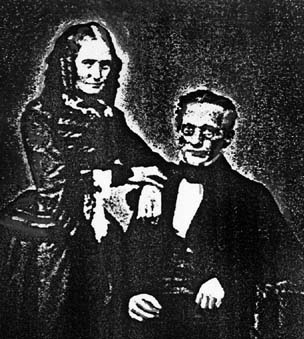
Ludwig Aaron Gans with his wife Rosette née Goldschmidt

Ludwig Aaron Gans (born 17 July 1794 in Celle, died 27 June 1871 in Frankfurt) (also spelled Ludwig Ahron Gans) was a German industrialist and owner of the company Cassella.

== Biography ==
Ludwig Aaron Gans was the son of Jewish parents Philipp Aaron Gans and Fanny Hanau from Celle. His family had been merchants in Celle for 150 years. In 1814 he moved in with the related Goldschmidt family in the Frankfurt Jewish Alley and joined the firm Cassel & Reiss, owned by Leopold Cassella, as an apprentice. Gans received the power of procuration and became the firm's effective leader in 1820.

In 1828, Gans married Rosette Goldschmidt (1805–1868), a niece and de facto adopted daughter of Leopold Cassella, and became a partner in the firm in the same year. From 1848 Ludwig Aaron Gans was the sole owner of Leopold Cassella & Co. Ludwig Aaron and Rosette Gans had six children: Henriette (Heidelbach), Marianne (Löwengard), Friedrich (Fritz) Ludwig, Pauline (Weinberg), Adolf and Leo Gans. The oldest son Friedrich Ludwig Gans joined Cassella & Co. as an apprentice in 1847 and would become a major industrialist and philanthropist in Germany; he converted to Christianity in 1885 and was ennobled in 1912. The younger son Leo Gans was also a noted industrialist, philanthropist and chemist.

Ludwig Aaron Gans is interred at the Old Jewish Cemetery, Frankfurt.
