= Friedrich Ludwig von Gans =

German industrialist, art collector and philanthropist

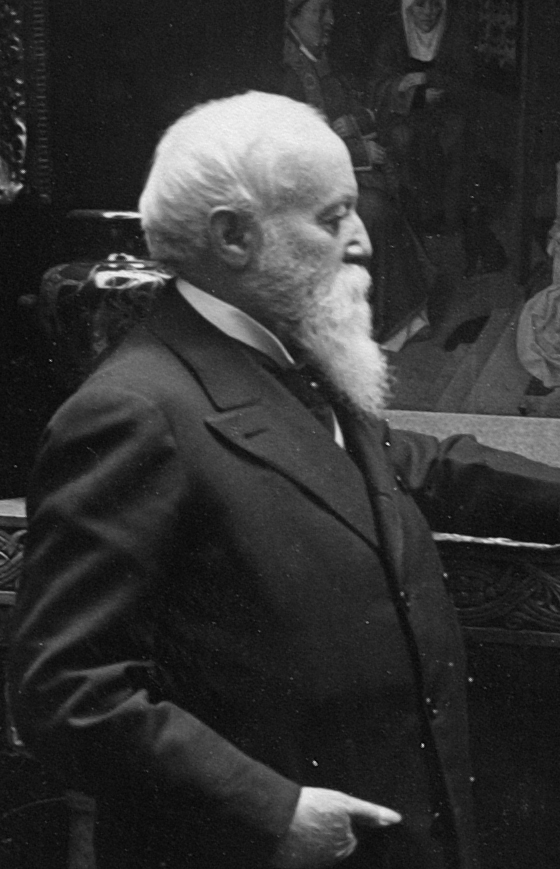
- Gans in 1912
- Born: Friedrich Ludwig Gans; 15 November 1833; Frankfurt am Main, German Confederation
- Died: 14 July 1920 (aged 86); Bad Homburg vor der Höhe, Germany
- Other name: Fritz Gans
- Occupations: Industrialist, art collector, philanthropist
- Spouse: Augusta Ettling
- Children: Adela "Fanny" Gans; Paul von Gans; Ludwig Wilhelm von Gans
- Father: Ludwig Aaron Gans
- Family: Gans family

Friedrich Ludwig von Gans (15 November 1833 – 14 July 1920), born Friedrich Ludwig Gans and known as Fritz Gans, was a German industrialist, art collector and philanthropist. He helped expand Leopold Cassella & Co. from a Frankfurt family dye business into a major synthetic-dye manufacturer and served as the company's commercial director.

Gans came from a German-Jewish mercantile family, converted to Protestantism in 1885 and was raised to the Prussian nobility in 1912. In the same year he donated his antiquities collection to the Royal Museums in Berlin; later scholarship described the gift as a nucleus for the Antikensammlung. Works from his collection continue to appear in museum provenance records and art-historical scholarship.

== Early life and family ==
Gans was born in Frankfurt am Main on 15 November 1833, the son of the merchant Ludwig Aaron Gans and Rosette Goldschmidt. The Gans family owned the trading house that developed into Leopold Cassella & Co..

In 1862 he married Augusta Ettling. They had three children: Adela "Fanny" Gans, Paul von Gans and Ludwig Wilhelm von Gans. Adela, later Adela Coit, later became active in the British and international women's suffrage movements and in the Ethical movement. Ludwig Wilhelm founded Pharma-Gans and became active in local politics in Oberursel. Under Nazi rule he left Germany; during the Second World War he was deported to Theresienstadt, liberated by the Swedish Red Cross, and died by suicide in Copenhagen in 1946.

Augusta Ettling was the sister of David Wilhelm Ettling, also known as Guillermo Ettling, who represented the House of Rothschild in Madrid.

== Cassella and the synthetic dye industry ==
Gans entered his father's dye business in 1847. In 1870 he helped establish the Frankfurter Anilinfarbenfabrik at Mainkur in Fechenheim with his brother Leo Gans, his brother-in-law Bernhard Weinberg and the chemist August Leonhardt. The new works formed part of the family business.

The business traded as Leopold Cassella & Co. from 1894, with Gans serving as commercial director. The Frankfurter Personenlexikon states that the dyes produced at Mainkur soon achieved a leading position on the world market. Cassella later became part of the German chemical-industry consolidation that led to IG Farben.

== Public roles, conversion and ennoblement ==
Gans was a member of the Frankfurt Chamber of Commerce and held the Prussian title of Wirklicher Geheimer Rat.

He converted from Judaism to Protestantism in 1885. In 1912, the year of his major donation to the Berlin museums, Wilhelm II raised him to the Prussian nobility.

== Philanthropy ==
Gans endowed and supported several charitable institutions in Frankfurt. His benefactions included the Verein Kinderheim at Böttgerstraße, the Fritz-Gans-Stiftung for police officers, the Fritz-und-Auguste-Gans-Stiftung for convalescent nurses, and welfare support for Cassella workers. During the First World War he also donated to wartime hospitals.

== Art collection and Berlin donation ==
After retiring from business, Gans built a collection that included paintings by Rembrandt, van Dyck, Goya and Rubens; works of the French nineteenth-century school; antique glass; medieval and Renaissance decorative arts; jewellery; and Greek and Roman sculpture.

His antiquities collection was developed with advice from the archaeologist and museum curator Robert Zahn. The surviving Robert Zahn papers in the Zentralarchiv of the Staatliche Museen zu Berlin include inventories, photographs, provenance notes and correspondence relating to the Gans collection.

In 1912 Gans donated his antiquities collection to the Royal Museums in Berlin. Later scholarship has described the gift as a nucleus for the Antikensammlung in the Altes Museum. Robert Zahn and Alfred Götze published an official museum article on the Gans collection in the Antiquarium the following year.

Art-historical literature continues to cite the collection. RIHA Journal describes Gans as a Frankfurt industrialist "who built a renowned art collection" and records his acquisition of Greco-Roman gold jewellery and glass from the archaeologist Peter Mavrogordato, excavator at Olbia on the Black Sea.

In 1917 Gans gave two paintings to the Städel in Frankfurt: a portrait of Bismarck by Franz von Lenbach and a view of old Frankfurt by Anton Burger.

After his death, much of the remaining collection was sold to the dealer Kurt Walter Bachstitz. Works formerly owned by Gans later entered museum collections. The J. Paul Getty Museum lists him as a former owner of a Roman bronze figure of Luna.

== Death and legacy ==
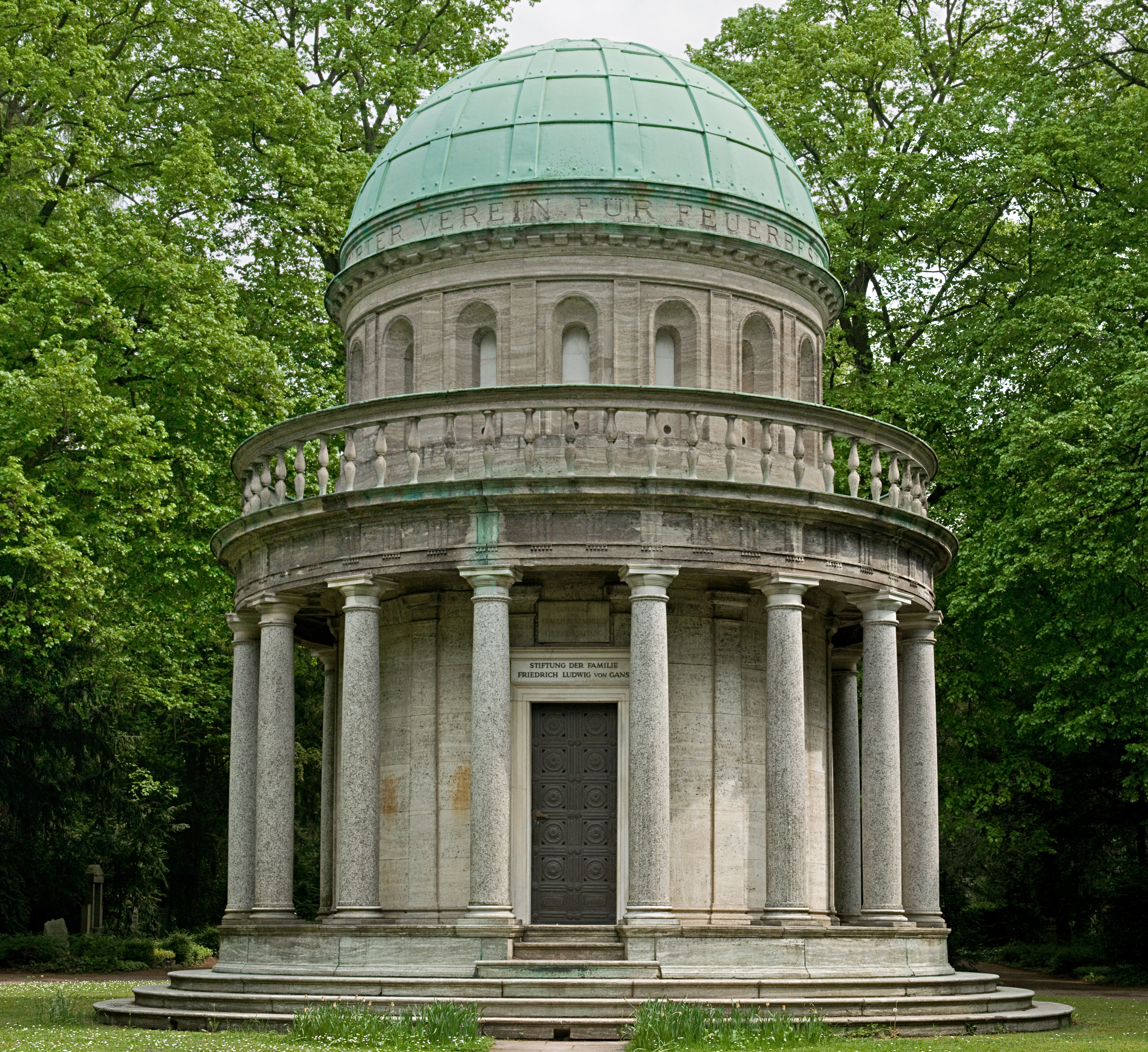
The Gans family mausoleum in Frankfurt Main Cemetery, commissioned in 1909

Gans died in Bad Homburg vor der Höhe on 14 July 1920 and was buried in Frankfurt Main Cemetery.

He had commissioned the Gans family mausoleum in 1909. Designed by Friedrich Hausmann, it was taken over by the Frankfurt Society for Cremation in 1932 and used for urn burials.

== See also ==
- Gans family
- Cassella
- Antikensammlung Berlin
