= Jus Suffragii =

Journal

The logo of Jus Suffragii

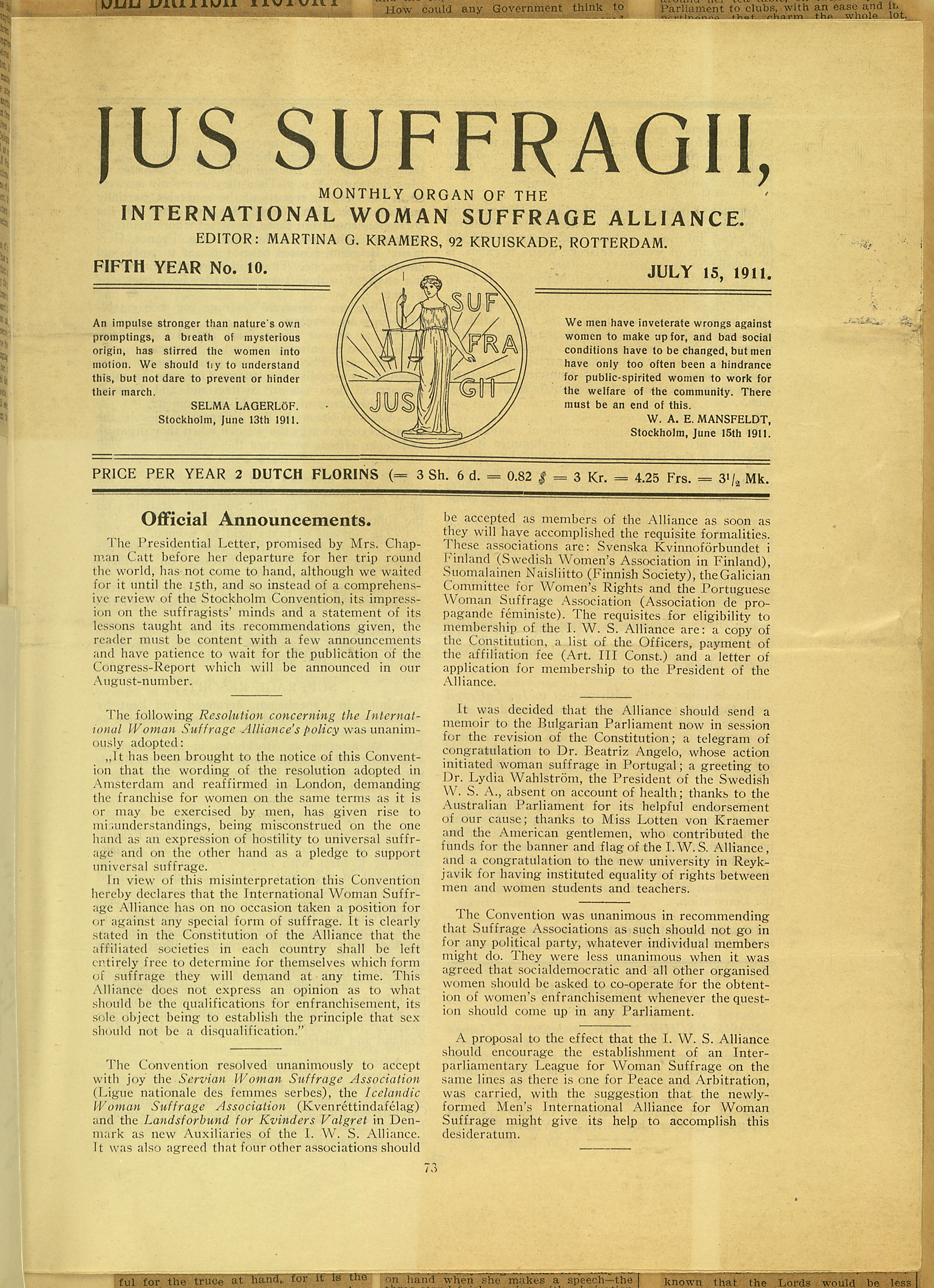
Cover of the Jus Suffragii, 15 July 1911

Jus Suffragii was the official journal of the International Woman Suffrage Alliance, published monthly from 1906 to 1924.

== History ==
The International Woman Suffrage Alliance (IWSA), now called the International Alliance of Women, was formed in 1904 in Germany, Berlin, by a group of prominent suffragists from many countries. The IWSA established Jus Suffragii, the official journal of the organisation, in 1906. Its title translates from Latin to "The Right of Suffrage".

The journal published news about the progress of the women's suffrage around the world, in addition to news about various other women's issues, including women leaders, women working in male-dominated fields, women's and children's health, marriage and divorce law, prostitution, women's education, maternity benefits, working conditions and the age of consent. It was published in English in London, and in French in Geneva. Each issue cost 4 pence in the United Kingdom, 4 marks in Germany, or 4 francs in France.

During World War I, Jus Suffragii was edited by Mary Sheepshanks, whose pacifist and feminist direction of the journal caused significant controversy. This began in 1914 when, after war broke out, Jus Suffragii shared its London offices with the International Women's Relief Committee, which had just been formed to provide aid to the hundreds of "enemy" German women who had become stranded in Britain. Sheepshanks apologised in the journal's pages to German and Austrian readers for the lack of news from those countries in what should have been an international journal and appealed to readers in neutral countries where the journal was distributed (Denmark, Sweden, Switzerland and the Netherlands) to obtain news about women in the "enemy" countries.

Under her editorship, the journal "tied women's interests to the cause of peace." The journal was openly criticised by several suffragist leaders, including the president of the IWSA itself, for abandoning its original focus on women's voting rights and launching "an active pacifist campaign". By the end of the war in 1919, however, Sheepshanks and Jus Suffragii received messages of gratitude and praise from around the world.

In 1917, the journal adopted the name The International Woman Suffrage News in addition to its original title. Sheepshanks stepped down as editor in 1920 and was succeeded by Wilhelmina Hay Abbott.

The journal ceased publication in 1924, when it was replaced by International Women's News as the IWSA's official periodical.

== See also ==
- Women's suffrage publications
- Timeline of women's suffrage
