= Leopold Cassella =

German merchant (1766–1847)

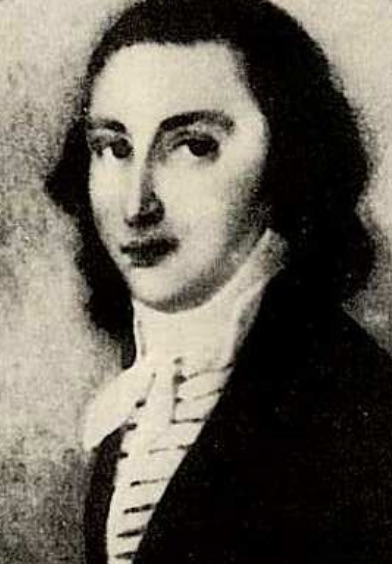
- Leopold Cassella
- Born: 8 December 1766; Friedberg, Hesse
- Died: 25 March 1847 (aged 80); Frankfurt
- Occupation: Merchant

Leopold Cassella (born 8 December 1766 in Friedberg, Hesse, died 25 March 1847 in Frankfurt) was a German businessman, known for having founded the company Cassella, one of many predecessor companies of today's Sanofi.

== Biography ==
Born David Löb Cassel, he grew up in a Jewish family in Friedberg as the son of a financier. After relocating to Frankfurt, he founded the company Cassel & Reiss with his brother-in-law Isaac Elias Reiss as a spice store in the Jewish Alley. He used the name Leopold Cassella for the first time when he married Nannette Reiss in Frankfurt in 1798, and acquired the Frankfurt burghership in 1812. He was also the founder of the Masonic lodge Zur aufgehenden Morgenröte, which consisted of Frankfurt citizens primarily of the Jewish faith. He had no children of his own, but he raised his niece Rosette Goldschmidt like his own daughter. She married an employee of the firm, Ludwig Aaron Gans, who became Cassella's heir.

Leopold Cassella is interred at the Old Jewish Cemetery, Frankfurt.
