= Cassella =

German chemical and dye company

- Logo of Cassella, featuring an Erlenmeyer flask
- Formerly: Cassel & Reiss (1798–1828); Leopold Cassella & Co. (1828–1925); Cassella Farbwerke Mainkur (1951–1978); Cassella AG (1978–1995)
- Industry: Chemicals, pharmaceuticals, cosmetics
- Founded: 1798
- Founder: Leopold Cassella
- Defunct: 1995
- Successor: Sanofi
- Headquarters: Frankfurt, Germany
- Products: Dyes, drugs, cosmetics, other chemical products
- Parent: Hoechst AG

Cassella AG, formerly Leopold Cassella & Co. and Cassella Farbwerke Mainkur AG, commonly known as Cassella, was a German chemical and pharmaceutical company with headquarters in Frankfurt am Main. Founded in 1798, in the Frankfurt Jewish Alley by Leopold Cassella, Cassella operated as an independent company until 1995, and was one of many predecessor companies of today's Sanofi. Its main products were dyes, drugs, cosmetics and various other chemical products. From 1949, Cassella focused increasingly on pharmaceuticals and cosmetics rather than its former primary focus, dyes. Much of its history is closely associated with the Gans family, a prominent family of industrialists and philanthropists and former owners of Cassella.

== History ==
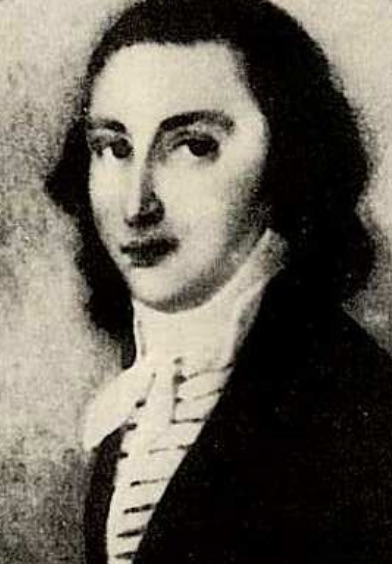
The firm's founder Leopold Cassella (1766–1847)

The company was founded as a spice store inside the Frankfurt Jewish Alley in 1798 by the Jewish businessman Leopold Cassella and his brother-in-law Isaac Elias Reiss, and was originally named Cassel & Reiss. In its early years, the company focused on importing luxury goods from India, China and South America, and Cassel and Reiss also founded a sugar refinery in 1812.

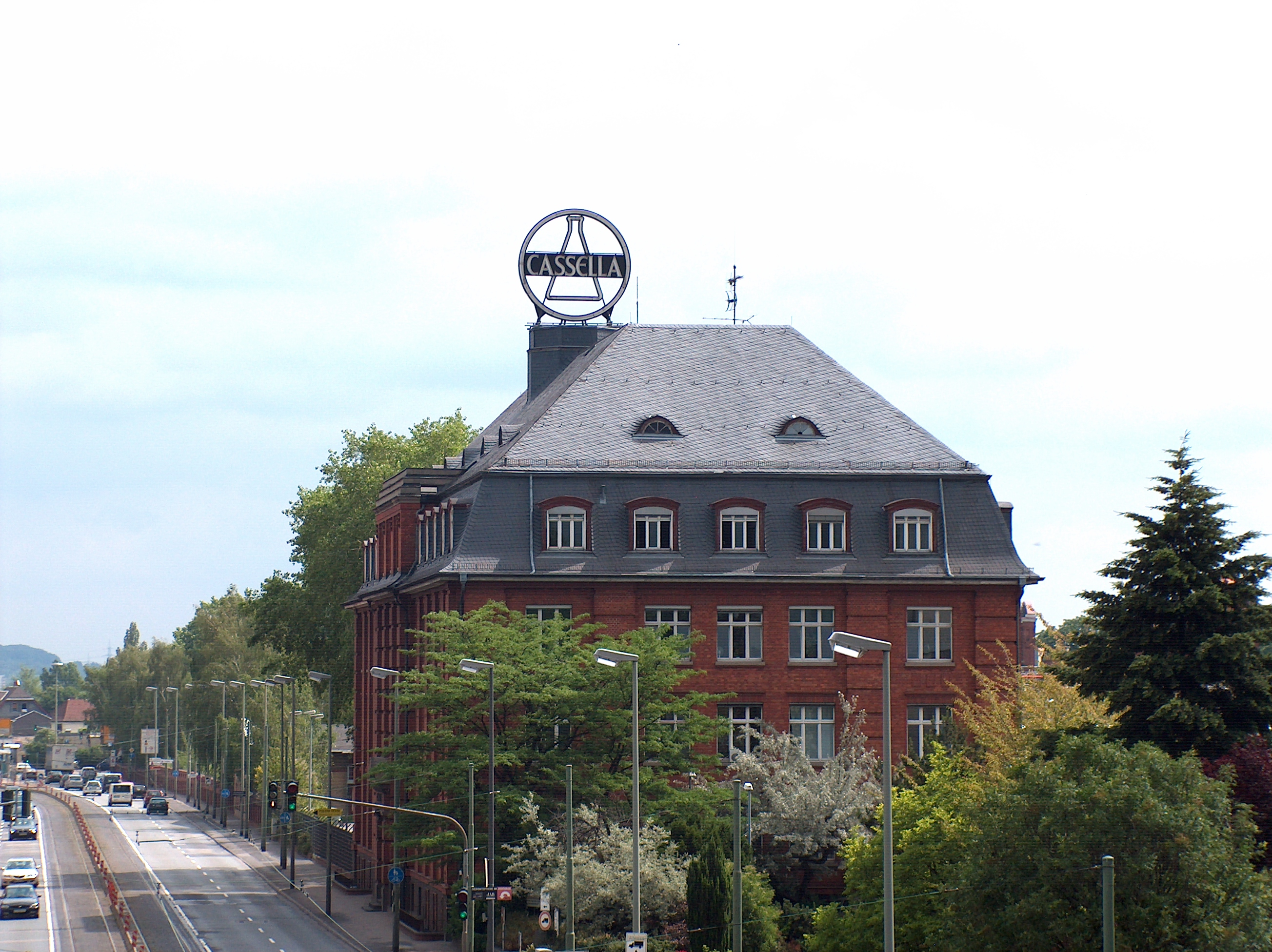
The former headquarters of Cassella in Fechenheim, Frankfurt, with the iconic Cassella Erlenmeyer flask logo on the roof

Himself childless, Cassella accepted Ludwig Aaron Gans as a partner in 1828, and the company became known as Leopold Cassella & Co. Gans was married to Cassella's niece, and the Gans family rose to great prominence as industrialists and philanthropists in Frankfurt in the following century. The family converted from Judaism to Protestantism in the late 19th century, and several family members were ennobled. In the 19th century, Cassella primarily traded with dye. In 1870, Friedrich and Leo Gans founded a dye factory at Mainkur in Fechenheim with their brother-in-law Bernhard Weinberg and the chemist August Leonhardt, called Frankfurter Anilinfarbenfabrik von Gans und Leonhardt. In 1894, the dye factory was merged with the Leopold Cassella & Co. dye wholesale company.

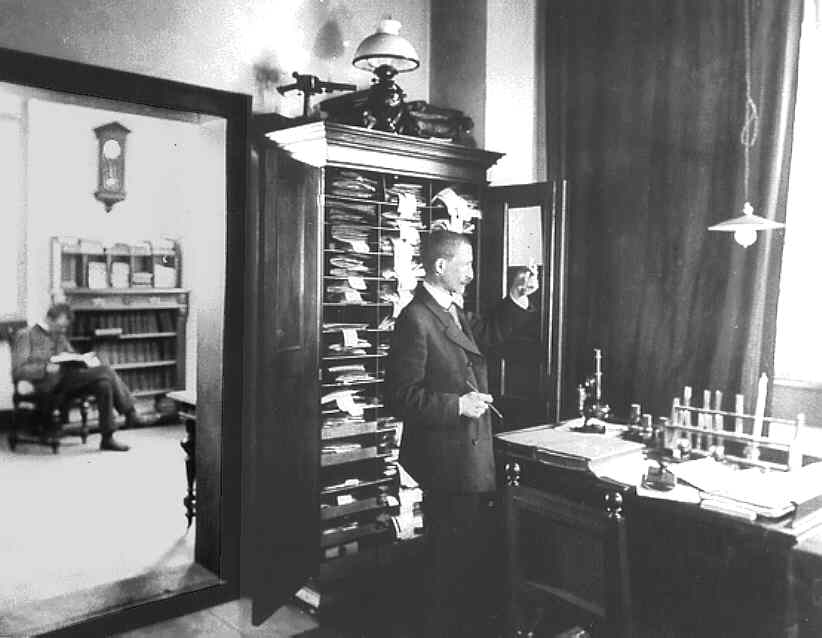
Arthur Weinberg in his laboratory, 1895

The Cassella dye factory was the largest employer of Fechenheim, employing around 3,000 people by 1914, and was the world's largest producer of synthetic dyes by the turn of the century. In 1900, Arthur Weinberg established a pharmaceutical division of the company, and collaborated closely with his friend Paul Ehrlich, the founder of chemotherapy. In 1925, Cassella merged into the new IG Farben trust, with Cassella co-owners Leo Gans and Arthur von Weinberg joining its supervisory board. After World War II the company was reestablished as Cassella Farbwerke Mainkur AG and the rebuilding under Richard von Szilvinyi and Werner Zerweck's leadership proved very successful, making the company the "darling of the stock exchange" in the 1950s. In 1951, Cassella had already surpassed its prewar production. Pharmaceutical research was reestablished in 1949, and a new laboratory was built. From 1949 the company focused increasingly on pharmaceuticals rather than its traditional primary focus, dyes. The company had around 2,000 employees by the early 1950s, and initially had the same shareholders as BASF, Bayer and Hoechst. In the mid 1950s BASF, Bayer and Hoechst bought the controlling majority with 25.1% each, while the remaining shares were owned by smaller shareholders. In 1970, Hoechst acquired the shares of BASF and Bayer. The company name was changed to Cassella AG in 1978.

Cassella operated as a separate company until 1995, when it was integrated in Hoechst and the smaller Cassella shareholders bought out. The Cassella cosmetics department was discontinued and the Cassella cosmetics subsidiary Jade in Fechenheim was sold to L'Oréal. In 1999, Hoechst merged with Rhône-Poulenc to form the French-German company Aventis with headquarters in Strasbourg and the main research and production facilities in Frankfurt. In 2004, this company merged with Sanofi-Synthélabo to form Sanofi-Aventis, which was renamed Sanofi in 2011. Sanofi, headquartered in Paris, employs around 7,000 people in its Frankfurt office, which also includes Sanofi's largest research and development centre.

Cassella and its subsidiaries had around 2,800 employees as of 1993.

In 2012, AllessaChemie secured the trademark rights to Cassella and has been using the traditional brand logo again since December of that year as a neon sign on the roof of the Cassella building in Frankfurt-Fechenheim. The logo has a diameter of five meters and is equipped with 208 fluorescent tubes with a total length of 178 meters. Since October 1, 2012, the former AllessaChemie GmbH has been trading as Allessa GmbH. It has been part of the WeylChem group of companies since 2013.

== Bibliography ==
- Bäumler, Ernst (1988). Die Rotfabriker. Familiengeschichte eines Weltunternehmens (in German). Munich: Piper. ISBN 3-492-10669-2.
