= Fechenheim =

- Quarter of Frankfurt am Main
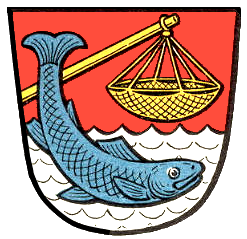
- Coat of arms

- Location of Fechenheim (red) and the Ortsbezirk Ost (light red) within Frankfurt am Main
- Interactive map of Fechenheim
- Location within Germany Location within Hesse
- Coordinates: 50°07′18″N 08°46′19″E
- Country: Germany
- State: Hesse
- Admin. region: Darmstadt
- District: Urban district
- City: Frankfurt am Main

Area
  - Total: 7.180 km^{2} (2.772 sq mi)

Population (2020-12-31)
  - Total: 17,843
  - Density: 2,485/km^{2} (6,436/sq mi)
- Time zone: UTC+01:00 (CET)
  - Summer (DST): UTC+02:00 (CEST)
- Postal codes: 60386
- Dialling codes: 069
- Vehicle registration: F
- Website: www.fechenheim.de

Fechenheim (German pronunciation: [ˈfɛçn̩haɪm]) is a quarter of Frankfurt am Main, Germany. It is part of the Ortsbezirk Ost and is subdivided into the Stadtbezirke Fechenheim-Nord and Alt-Fechenheim.
