= Hut 3 =

Part of Second World War UK government cypher school

Coordinates: 51.99766°N 0.74208°W

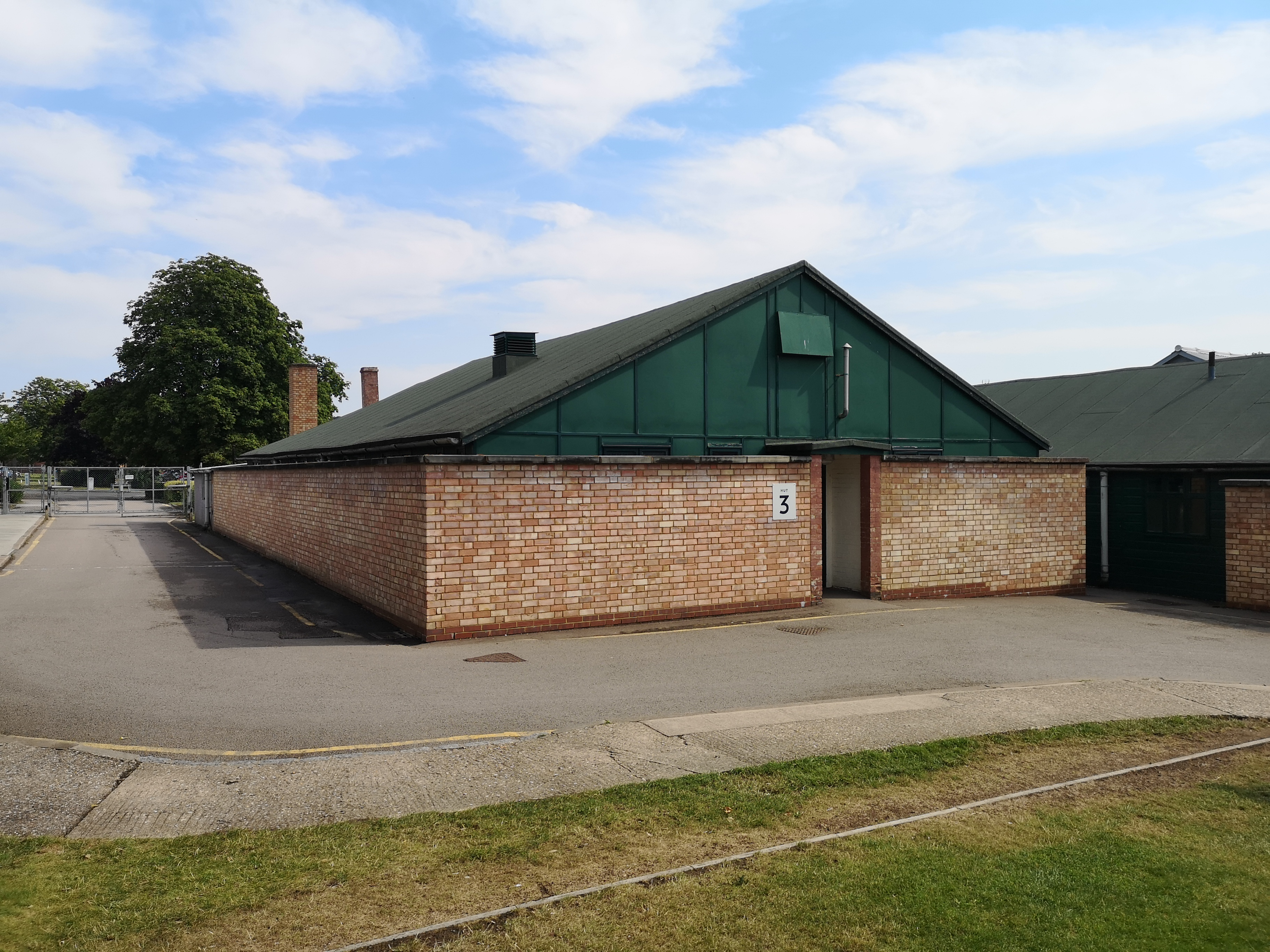
Hut 3 with a blast wall rebuilt by Bletchley Park Trust. After the Hut 3 functions moved into Block D this building was renumbered Hut 23.

Hut 3 was a section of the Government Code and Cypher School at Bletchley Park during World War II. It retained the name for its functions when it moved into Block D. It produced military intelligence codenamed Ultra from the decrypts of Enigma, Tunny and multiple other sources. Hut 3 thus became an intelligence agency in its own right, providing information of great strategic value, but rarely of operational use. Group Captain Eric Malcolm Jones led this activity from 1943 and after the war became deputy director, and in 1952 director of GCHQ. In July 1945, General Dwight D. Eisenhower, Supreme Commander of the Allied Expeditionary Force, wrote to Sir Stewart Menzies, Chief of the British Secret Intelligence Service (MI6) saying inter alia:

"The intelligence that has emanated from you before and during this campaign has been of priceless value to me. It has simplified my task as commander enormously. It has saved thousands of British and American lives and, in no small way, has contributed to the speed with which the enemy was routed and eventually forced to surrender."

== Development ==
The "German Army and Air Force Enigma Reporting Section" was set up in January 1940. That name, however, was soon dropped in favour of "Hut 3" as a description both of the location and of the functions and this was retained when, in February 1943 it moved into Block D. These became very much more than just the translation, interpretation and distribution of German Army and Air Force Enigma messages deciphered by Hut 6. As F. L. 'Peter' Lucas said

It was not a matter of receiving messages and translating them; it was a matter of receiving material which was nearly always more or less imperfect, often incomplete, rarely intelligible with ease, and at its worst totally meaningless to even the best German scholar.

By the time of D-Day in June 1944 Hut 3 was synthesising a torrent of signals intelligence ("SIGINT") data from multiple sources and producing an outgoing flood of useful intelligence. David Kenyon, Research Historian at Bletchley Park has been able to access a number of unpublished sources, in particular "The History of Hut Three", a GCHQ document in The National Archives (HW3/119) for his 2019 book "Bletchley Park and D-Day: The Untold Story of How the Battle for Normandy Was Won".

Initially, there were serious personal frictions between the four main people. They were the original leader, Lieutenant-Commander Malcolm Saunders, Squadron Leader Robert Humphreys (senior liaison officer with the Air Force), Captain Curtis (senior liaison officer with the War Office, who knew no German), and Cambridge academic F. L. Lucas who had been in the Intelligence Corps in World War I. Humphreys was “an excellent German linguist, but no team player”. He wanted to get his own way and found this difficult to do, if only because Saunders had a mind of his own. Nigel de Grey described the situation as "an imbroglio of conflicting jealousies, intrigues and differing opinions".

Early in 1942 the Air Ministry sent Squadron Leader Eric Jones to investigate the problem. He had worked as a businessman in the textile industry in Cheshire (speaking with "Cheshire vowels") for 20 years before joining up in 1940. His report so impressed the Director of GC&CS Edward Travis that, in July 1942, Saunders, Humphreys and Curtis were moved out of Hut 3, and Jones was promoted to Group Captain and put in sole charge. Just over a year later, H. S. Marchant was made deputy to Jones, and the pair were in charge until the end of the war. There were a number of sections: Air Section "3A", Military Section "3M", a small Naval Section "3N", a multi-service Research Section "3G" and a large liaison section "3L".

The name “Hut 3” was retained when its functions and those of Hut 4, Hut 6, Hut 8 and the Signals Intelligence and Traffic Analysis group – known as "SIXTA" – moved to a new brick building, Block D, in February 1943. The decoded messages from Hut 6 for Hut 3, which previously had been sent in a tray via a wooden tunnel between the huts, were then sent by a conveyor belt that “never stopped”.

== Operation ==
The Enigma “Red” cypher was the main cypher used by the Luftwaffe in every theatre where they operated. Red had been broken sporadically from the beginning of 1940, and from 22 May BP overcame some changes to the Enigma machines. From then on, Hut 6 broke Red daily to the end of the war, and it became the “constant staple” of ULTRA. Calvocoressi wrote that later in the war “we in Hut 3 would get a bit tetchy if Hut 6 had not broken Red by breakfast time.”

Initially there were only four people in Hut 3, and there were serious personal frictions between them. They were the original leader, Lieutenant-Commander Malcolm Saunders, Squadron Leader Robert Humphreys (senior liaison officer with the Air Force), Captain Curtis (senior liaison officer with the War Office, who knew no German), and Cambridge academic F. L. Lucas who had been in the Intelligence Corps in World War I. Humphreys was “an excellent German linguist, but no team player. He wanted to get his own way. He found this difficult to do if only because Saunders had a mind of his own. Nigel de Grey described the situation as 'an imbroglio of conflicting jealousies, intrigues and differing opinions'. Initially Travis moved the three [Saunders, Humphreys and Curtis] out of Hut 3 and put a small committee including Eric Jones in charge. As this did not work, Jones was made sole head in July 1942. Just over a year after he took over, H. S. Marchant was made his deputy, and the pair were in charge to the end of the war.”

Army and Air Force Ultra was distributed by Special Liaison Units. By the end of the war there were about 40 SLUs to 40 commands. Signals were given a priority from Z to ZZZZZ (the highest of 5), and about 100,000 signals were sent to commands during the war

The rules of interpretation for Hut 3 were that if the text was not explicit the Hut 3 officer could not add his interpretation without qualification; for a 1944 SS Panzer message where the placename had been missed or corrupted when received, the officer did not say simply “Dreux” but would say “slight indications Dreux” or “fair indications Dreux” or “strong indications Dreux”. They could also add glosses preceded by the word “Comment”.

The Air Index had “hundreds of thousands” of cards about 5 by 9 inches; that they were photographed and stored in the underground stack of the Bodleian Library in Oxford in case they were destroyed by bombing. Organized by “about two dozen girls” and a man who was a “strange genius”, it had cards for every individual, unit, place, and equipment such that any previous reference to a given target could be found. There were two card indexes, 3A & 3M.

=== Accolades ===
In April 2019, additional information about the work of the Hut 3 team led by Eric Malcolm Jones was revealed by historian David Kenyon, preliminary to an exhibition starting on 2019 the anniversary of D-Day, that would highlight the contribution leading up to events in June 1944. The exhibition, D-day: Interception, Intelligence, Invasion, details the preparations for the landings and reveals Jones’s essential interpretation and cataloguing system for the massive amounts of data from the team that was intercepting intelligence after cracking coded messages from the Germans using the Enigma machines. "Jones’s skill at putting together all the information coming in was crucial", said Kenyon.

Peronel Craddock, Head of Collections and Exhibitions at Bletchley Park offered this comment in an interview: "We really can say that Jones, by leading his team inside Hut 3, was at least equally important to Turing in this part of the story. And there we are talking about someone recently declared by the BBC as Britain’s leading icon".

== Personnel ==
"Warum denn so einfach? Können Sie es nicht komplizierter machen?" [:Why then so simple? Can't you make it more complicated?]

― Hut 3 translators' jest, on receiving a decrypted Enigma signal in unusually straightforward German.
F. L. Lucas (Hut 3 1939-45), Style, 3rd edn. 2012

- Malcolm Saunders, the original head
- Eric Malcolm Jones, head from April 1943
- Herbert Stanley Marchant, deputy head from 1943 (later Ambassador to Cuba and Tunisia)
- Rodney Bax, an Intelligence Corps captain in the Fusion Room (briefly married to Christine Brooke-Rose).
- Christine Brooke-Rose
- Peter Calvocoressi, head of the Air Section
- F. L. (Peter) Lucas, head of the Research Section from July 1942; head of the History Section, from June 1945
- Ralph Bennett, Major (later professor of history at Magdalene College Cambridge)
- John Cairncross, KGB agent
- Donald A. Camfield
- Captain Curtis
- Kathleen Godfrey, WAAF officer who worked on translating and indexing
- Robert Humphreys
- Brinley "Bryn" Newton-John from Wales, father of singer Olivia Newton-John
- Oscar Oeser, Wing Commander
- Reginald (Gerry) Bragg, translator (Director of Birmingham Polytechnic 1971). https://bletchleypark.org.uk/roll-of-honour/1052
- John H. Plumb, moved to the Naval section, Hut 8; (later a historian)
- Jim Rose, journalist and campaigner
- Phoebe Senyard, administrator and supervisor of clerical staff
- Frederick Winterbotham, until he moved back to London in winter 1939-40

A photograph of the Officers of 3A in 1943 or 1944 names them as: Labertouche, Brooke, Faure, Newton-John, Haskins, Bragg, Ware, Squire, Calvocoressi, van Norden, Harrow, Myers, Pilley, Manners-Wood, Rose, Cullingham, Millward.

== Bibliography ==
- Briggs, Asa (2011), Secret Days: Code-breaking in Bletchley Park, Barnsley, England: Frontline Books, ISBN 978-1-84832-615-6
- Calvocoressi, Peter (1980), Top Secret Ultra, London: Cassell Ltd, ISBN 0-304-30546-4
- Kenyon, David (16 July 2019), Bletchley Park and D-Day: The Untold Story of How the Battle for Normandy Was Won, Yale University Press, ISBN 978-0-300-24357-4 The information from this source cited in this article is often in turn cited from a document “The History of Hut Three” an unpublished GCHQ typescript that is in The National Archives (TNA) HW3/119.
- McKay, Sinclair (2010). The Secret Life of Bletchley Park. London: Aurum Press. ISBN 978-1-84513539-3.
- Nelson, Eric L. (September 2018), "The peripheral and central indexes at Bletchley Park during the Second World War", The Indexer, 36 (3): 95–101
- Smith, Michael (2007) [1998], Station X: The Codebreakers of Bletchley Park, Pan Grand Strategy Series (Pan Books ed.), London: Pan McMillan Ltd, ISBN 978-0-330-41929-1
- Smith, Michael (2015). The Debs of Bletchley Park. London: Aurum Press. ISBN 978-1-78131-388-6.
- Welchman, Gordon (1997) [1982], The Hut Six story: Breaking the Enigma codes, Cleobury Mortimer, England: M&M Baldwin, ISBN 9780947712341 New edition updated with an addendum consisting of a 1986 paper written by Welchman that corrects his misapprehensions in the 1982 edition.
