= Alec Naylor Dakin =

British Egyptologist, Bletchley Park veteran and school-teacher

Alec Naylor Dakin (3 April 1912 – 14 June 2003) was a Fellow of University College, Oxford, a cryptologist at Bletchley Park, an Egyptologist and schoolmaster.

== Early life and family ==
Alec Dakin was born in Mytholmroyd in the West Riding of Yorkshire in 1912, the son of inventor and sawmaker, Bertram Alexander Dakin and his wife Annie Louise Naylor who were married in 1908 in Todmorden. He came from an inventive family since his father, who was born in 1879, was an inventor (of carving knives, saws, pan handles and wall coatings). He won a scholarship to Heath School, Halifax.

== Academic career ==
At school he won a second scholarship, this time to Queen's College, Oxford. There he read Greats and took walks with his fellow Yorkshire scholarship-boy and Nonconformist, Harold Wilson. Alec's tutor, Oliver Franks encouraged him to begin the study of Egyptology, and he was also guided by Professor Battiscombe Gunn, an English Egyptologist and philologist who had published his first translation from Egyptian in 1906 and, in 1934, was appointed Professor of Egyptology at the University of Oxford just a few years prior to Alec's time there where Battiscombe devoted himself to his pupils and his classes, at the expense of his own research. In 1936 at the age of 24, Alec became a Fellow of University College, Oxford.

== Cryptology ==
During his studies Alec had acquired fluent German, which would later turn out to be extremely advantageous to his career. He was clearly destined for a distinguished career as an Oxford Egyptologist but just two years later in 1940, his life took an unexpected turn when he was recruited by her Majesty's government to work as a cryptographer at Bletchley Park – to assist the war effort. He worked in complete secrecy in hut 4, alongside many others at Bletchley, including the well known cryptographer, Alan Turing who was put in charge of all of them by Winston Churchill. He later described this period as the happiest time of his life and especially enjoyed the challenge of the early days, before the Colossus computer took over the decrypting.

== Enigma ==
Alec was responsible for rapidly translating the decrypted German naval Enigma signals for the Admiralty to determine which ones were most important.

== Memorable decryptions ==
One such signal was from the Bismarck which read "Most immediate. Torpedo hit right aft. Ship unmanoeuvrable. We fight to the last shell. Long live the Fuehrer." Another might simply inform a numbered rating on a U-boat that his home in Germany had been bombed.

Dakin was one of the first people to read the message "The Fuehrer Adolf Hitler is dead." although this was somewhat premature as Hitler actually survived the assassination attempt that this signal presaged.

== Total secrecy ==
As with other Bletchley Park staff he was obliged to take an oath of secrecy, never speaking to anyone of his war work, even his wife Joan, whom he married in 1953. He tried to join the Royal Navy, but was prevented on the grounds that he knew too much to risk his being captured.

== Codebreakers book ==
Together with Ernest Ettinghausen, Walter Ettinghausen's younger brother, he described the work of Hut 4 for secret Foreign Office files. It was so secret that he was not even allowed to consult it himself when eventually he wrote his chapter on the work of Hut 4 for "Codebreakers: The inside story of Bletchley Park", an inside story account of Bletchley Park, edited by F. H. Hinsley and Alan Stripp.

== Postwar career ==
After the war he decided to become a schoolmaster instead of returning to Oxford. He thought that he could more directly help to build the world by influencing young people at their most formative stage. In 1946 he joined the staff at Kingswood School, Bath, teaching classics, and remained there until his retirement in 1969.
