= Baroness McIntosh =

Baroness McIntosh may refer to:

- Genista McIntosh, Baroness McIntosh of Hudnall (born 1946), British arts consultant, theatre executive and politician
- Anne McIntosh, Baroness McIntosh of Pickering (born 1954), British politician
