= Station X (British TV series) =

1999 British documentary television series

- Country of origin: United Kingdom
- No. of episodes: 4

Production
- Executive producer: John Smithson

Original release
- Network: Channel 4
- Release: January 19, 1999

Station X is a British television documentary series detailing the story of how Germany's Enigma code was broken. It was broadcast on Channel 4 in 1999. John Smithson was executive producer. It was accompanied by the "Channel 4 Books" publication Station X: The Codebreakers of Bletchley Park (1998), authored by Michael Smith which became a UK Number 1 bestseller. The first episode aired on Channel 4 on 19 January 1999. Tim Gardam, Channel 4's director of programmes, insisted that Station X be broadcast at the peak viewing time.

The programme maker Peter Bate used full-scale reconstructions. Instead of a chronological narrative; Bate relied on short dramatised shots and anecdotes by various Bletchley veterans. Those featured included Peter Calvocoressi, Ralph Bennett, Mavis Batey, John Herivel, Lord Briggs, Donald Michie, Shaun Wylie, Leslie Yoxall and Alan Rogers. The story covered the contributions of various real life characters including Hans-Thilo Schmidt, Marian Rejewski, Henryk Zygalski, Jerzy Różycki, Geoffrey Tandy, Dilly Knox, Josh Cooper and Andrew Cunningham.

The stories covered various aspects of the breaking of the Enigma naval codes, the captures from the U-boat U-110 and other relevant material from German weather ship Lauenburg and München and the German armed trawler Krebs during the Lofoten raid.

== Episodes ==
The series was split into four episodes 1. The keys to the Reich, 2. The goose, that laid the golden eggs, 3. The Ultra Secret, and 4. The war of the machines.

=== The keys to the Reich ===
The first episode revealed that Station X was the cover name for the World War II radio interception station co-located with the Government Code and Cypher School at Bletchley Park. In 1938 the British Secret Service bought Bletchley Park, installing wireless receiver (call-sign: "Station X") to pick up German messages. A small group of aristocratic codebreakers visited the Country house with their staff and butlers under the guise of "Captain Ridley's shooting party" to establish its suitability.

With war Military Intelligence began to recruit various skillsets. Geoffrey Tandy, a marine biologist expert in Cryptogams, was selected when someone confused these with cryptograms. The youthfulness of many staff was noted by biographer Andrew Hodges, who noted that young people had the keys to the Reich.

=== The goose that laid the golden eggs ===
The programme includes analysis of discusses The Herivel Tip, an imaginative cracking method which relied on the laziness of the Enigma operators when setting up their machines in the morning.

=== The Ultra Secret ===
The programme starts with the 1941 Invasion of Russia. Contributors include David Kahn

In a speech Winston Churchill publicises mass executions and the systematic slaughter of Jews, feeling the outrage greater than the imperative to protect the source.

Loris Gherardi's role in the Theft of the Black Code, and its continued use under Colonel Norman Fiske and Bonner Fellers, is reconstructed.

== Critical reception ==
Tom Hibbert of The Observer and Sandy Smithies of The Guardian both found the first episode fascinating. James Delingpole, Ludovic Kennedy and other critics found the documentary portentous and plodding. Robert Hanks of The Independent found the explanations were too brief to make the technicalities penetrable.
