= Anthony Lester, Baron Lester of Herne Hill =

British politician and barrister (1936–2020)

The Right Honourable The Lord Lester of Herne Hill QC
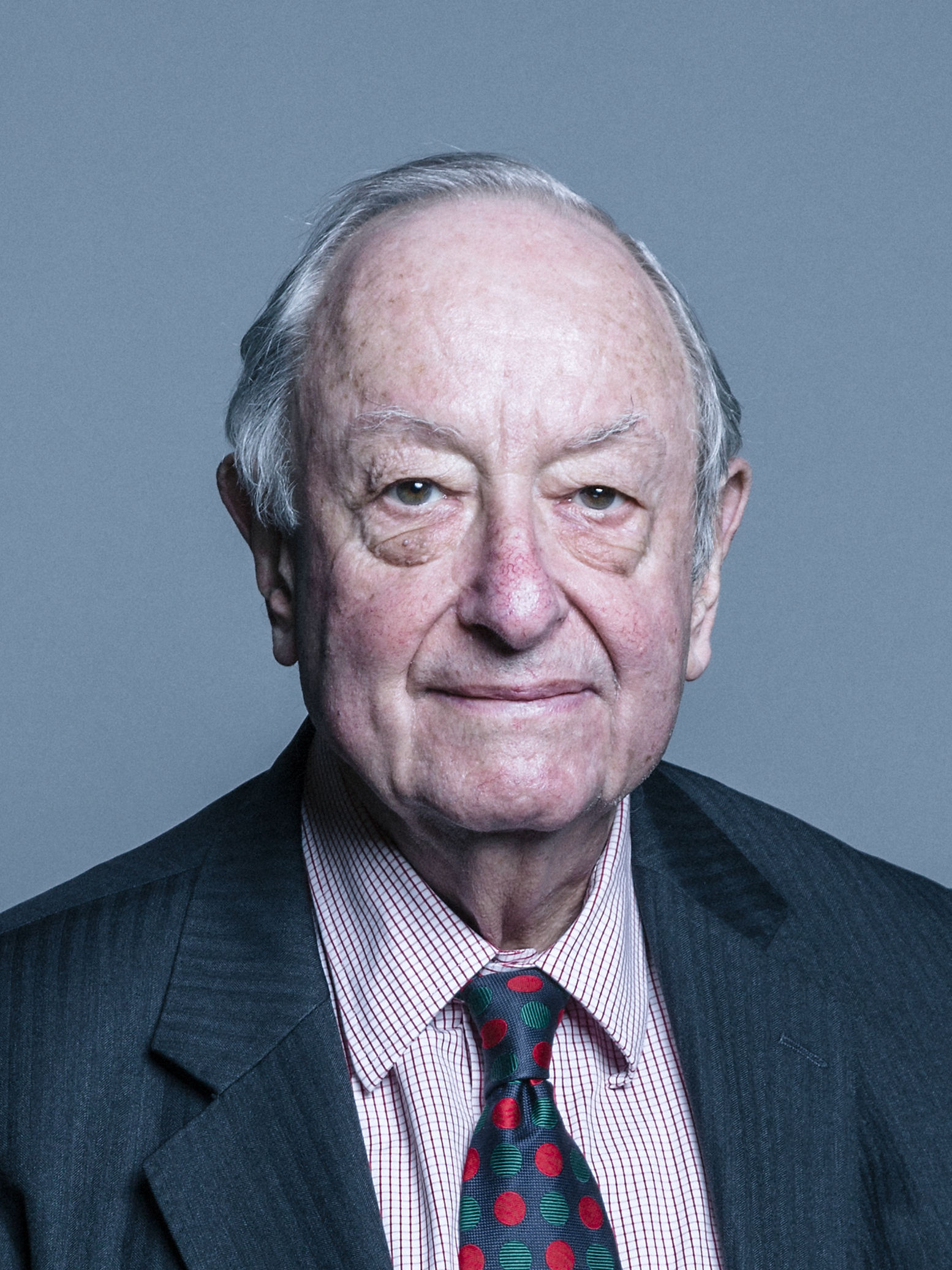
- Official portrait, 2018

Member of the House of Lords
- Lord Temporal
- Life peerage 13 October 1993 – 12 December 2018

Personal details
- Born: Anthony Paul Raab; 3 July 1936 London, England
- Died: 8 August 2020 (aged 84) London, England
- Party: Labour (until 1981); SDP (1981–1988); Liberal Democrats (1988–2018); Change UK (2019)
- Spouse: Catherine Wassey (m. 1971)
- Children: Gideon; Maya
- Occupation: Politician, lawyer

Anthony Paul Lester, Baron Lester of Herne Hill, QC (né Raab; 3 July 1936 – 8 August 2020) was a British barrister and member of the House of Lords. He was at different times a member of the Labour Party, Social Democratic Party and the Liberal Democrats. Lester was best known for his influence on race relations legislation in the United Kingdom and as a founder-member of groups such as the Institute of Race Relations, the Campaign Against Racial Discrimination and the Runnymede Trust. Lester was also a prominent figure in promoting birth control and abortion through the Family Planning Association, particularly in Northern Ireland.

== Early life and education ==
Lester was born Anthony Paul Raab to a Jewish family in London in 1936. His father immigrated to England from Hungary. His parents divorced shortly after his birth, and he was raised by his mother, Kate Cooper-Smith, and stepfather, Harry Lester, who later formally adopted him. He was educated at the City of London School. He then studied history and law at Trinity College, Cambridge, and Harvard Law School, graduating with Bachelor of Arts and Master of Laws degrees respectively. He performed his royal service in the Royal Artillery from 1955 to 1957.

== Legal career ==
Lester was called to the bar at Lincoln's Inn in 1963 and took silk in 1975. In 1987, he was appointed as a recorder and was in office until 1993. As a barrister he worked from 2 Hare Court, latterly named Blackstone Chambers. He was appointed adjunct professor of the Faculty of Law at University College Cork in 2005.

=== Race relations ===
While in the United States, Lester extensively visited the South, and this experience influenced his later work on race relations, when in the 1960s and 1970s, he was directly involved with the drafting of race relations legislation in Britain. During these periods, he acted as the chair of the legal subcommittee of the Campaign Against Racial Discrimination (C.A.R.D.) and was a member of several organisations working for racial equality such as the Society of Labour Lawyers, Fabian Society, Council of the Institute of Race Relations, British Overseas Socialist Fellowship and the National Committee for Commonwealth Immigrants. In 1968, he co-founded the Runnymede Trust think-tank with Jim Rose. He was chairman of the Runnymede Trust from 1991 to 1993.

=== Special adviser ===
A member of the Labour Party who was the party's candidate in Worthing in 1966, Lester was a special adviser to Roy Jenkins at the Home Office in the 1970s, and moved with Jenkins from Labour to the Social Democratic Party (SDP) in 1981. On 29 June 2007, Lester was appointed by Gordon Brown as a special adviser on constitutional reform to the Secretary of State for Justice. Lester was a member of the Joint Committee on Human Rights.

=== Family Planning Association ===
Lester was a patron of the Family Planning Association, previously called the National Birth Control Committee.

=== Peerage ===
Lester's peerage was announced on 13 August 1993. He was raised to the peerage as Baron Lester of Herne Hill, of Herne Hill in the London Borough of Southwark, on 13 October 1993. He sat in the Lords as a Liberal Democrat until February 2018, when an allegation of sexual misconduct was made.

On 12 November 2018, the House of Lords Committee for Privileges and Conduct made a recommendation that he be suspended from the House of Lords until June 2022 as a result of a complaint of sexual harassment from Jasvinder Sanghera. On 15 November 2018, by a vote of 101–78, the House of Lords referred the matter back to the Committee for Privileges and Conduct on the ground that the Commissioner for Standards had failed to act in accordance with the principles of natural justice and fairness. After the matter was remitted to the committee, the Senior Deputy Speaker (the Chairman of the committee) expressed his disappointment at the decision of the House, saying that the Commissioner had "followed the processes as agreed by the House and that have not been questioned before today." The report of the Commissioner for Standards had responded to various criticisms of the fairness of the process.

Lester resigned from the House of Lords on 12 December 2018. He said that he lacked the strength or health to continue, after the Committee disagreed with the House's conclusion regarding the fairness of the process and renewed the recommendation of his suspension until June 2022. Notwithstanding his retirement, the House subsequently confirmed the committee's recommendation.

In April 2019, he joined The Independent Group.

== Honours ==
Lester was elected an international member of the American Philosophical Society in 2003.

== Collections ==
University College London holds Lester's archive, which was donated to the institution by his daughter Maya. The collection contains correspondence, written answers from the House of Lords from questions put to them by Lester, and writings.

== Personal life ==
Lester married barrister Catherine "Katya" Wassey in 1971. They had two children: Gideon Lester and Maya Lester KC.

Lester died from heart disease at his home in London on 8 August 2020, at the age of 84.

== See also ==
- Geoffrey Bindman
- Richard Stone (campaigner)
- Jim Rose (journalist)

Party political offices
Preceded by Brian Abel-Smith	Treasurer of the Fabian Society; 1968–1974	Succeeded by Giles Radice
Preceded by Peter Hall	Chair of the Fabian Society; 1972–1973	Succeeded by Frank Judd
