= Jim Rose (journalist) =

British intelligence officer, journalist and activist (1909–1999)

Eliot Joseph Benn "Jim" Rose (7 June 1909 – 21 May 1999) was a British intelligence officer, journalist and campaigner.

== Early life ==
Born into an "elite" Jewish family, Rose was educated at Rugby School and New College, Oxford.

== Career ==
During World War II, he served with the Royal Air Force as an intelligence officer with 609 Squadron. In 1941, he moved to the Government Code and Cypher School at Bletchley Park where he worked initially in Hut 3 and assessed decrypted messages sent by the German Luftwaffe. In 1944, he transferred to London to where he worked on coordination with the Air Ministry. He retired from the RAF in 1945 with the rank of Wing Commander, and took a job as a journalist with Reuters. In January 1946 he married Pamela Gibson who had also worked at Bletchley Park. They had two children.

From 1948 to 1951, Rose was literary editor of The Observer.

In 1951, the family moved to Zürich, Switzerland, where he had become director of the newly formed International Press Institute.

Rose returned to England in 1962 to become director of Survey of Race Relations, a five-year study into post-war immigration in Britain. The study was published in 1969 as Colour and Citizenship. In 1968, he co-founded the Runnymede Trust think-tank with politician Anthony Lester.

In the late 1990s, he contributed to a television series about the work at Bletchley Park.
