= Pamela Rose =

British actress and Bletchley Park veteran (1917–2021)

- Pamela Gibson, later Pamela Rose, before the Second World War
- Born: Susan Pamela Gibson; 29 November 1917; Knightsbridge, London, England
- Died: 17 October 2021 (aged 103)
- Other names: Pamela Gibson
- Occupations: Actress, wartime intelligence indexer, school counsellor and charity trustee
- Spouse: Jim Rose
- Children: 2
- Parent(s): Thornely Carbutt Gibson and Elizabeth "Dolly" Wetzlar
- Relatives: Patrick Gibson, Baron Gibson (brother)

Pamela Rose (born Susan Pamela Gibson; 29 November 1917 – 17 October 2021) was a British actress, wartime intelligence indexer, school counsellor and charity trustee. As Pamela Gibson, she acted professionally in the late 1930s and worked with the Entertainments National Service Association before joining Bletchley Park's Naval Section, where she led Hut 4's index of decrypted German naval messages. After the war she married the journalist Jim Rose, worked as a school counsellor in Paddington, and served as vice-chair of the National Society for the Prevention of Cruelty to Children and later chair of the Stroke Association. In 2002, after an absence from professional theatre of around six decades, she returned to the West End in Peter Hall's production of Lady Windermere's Fan.

== Early life and education ==
Susan Pamela Gibson was born on 29 November 1917 in Knightsbridge, London, during a Zeppelin raid. She was the daughter of Thornely Carbutt Gibson, a stockbroker, former Irish Guards officer and bass-baritone singer, and his wife Elizabeth "Dolly" Gibson, née Wetzlar. Her elder brother was Patrick Gibson, Baron Gibson.

After the First World War, her father undertook intelligence reporting in Germany; his 1919 memorandum Bolshevism in Germany was circulated to the War Cabinet by Winston Churchill. Her parents hosted regular musical evenings, known in the family as "Pleasant Wednesday Evenings", at which they and their friends performed operatic arias and German lieder. Gibson attended Broadstairs Preparatory School as a boarder from the age of six and later attended Westonbirt School in Gloucestershire.

After leaving school, Gibson took part in the debutante season at her parents' insistence, but wanted to act rather than marry. She left for Paris, where she studied French and cabaret performance with Yvette Guilbert. She then stayed with family friends in Munich and learnt German before returning to London to train at the Webber Douglas School of Singing and Dramatic Art.

== Acting and wartime work ==
Gibson began acting professionally in the late 1930s. In 1939 she appeared as Pegeen Mike in Synge's The Playboy of the Western World at the Mercury Theatre, Notting Hill Gate, opposite Cyril Cusack as Christy Mahon. The Daily Telegraph, summarising a contemporary Times review, reported that the critic praised her performance for its "vigour and a healthy country simplicity".

At the start of the Second World War, Gibson joined the Entertainments National Service Association, performing in productions in Bournemouth and Birmingham. In early 1942 she was offered her first West End role, in Lillian Hellman's Watch on the Rhine at the Aldwych Theatre, but instead accepted secret war work after an interview with Frank Birch, head of Bletchley Park's Naval Section Hut 4. Birch, who had also worked in theatre, advised her: "the stage can wait, the war can't".

At Bletchley Park, Gibson worked on the Naval Section's index of decrypted German naval messages. The work involved recording key details from deciphered enemy messages on file cards, including U-boats, German ships, officers, ports and procedures. Gibson later recalled that the index began in "a few shoe boxes in a small wooden hut" and expanded to fill three large rooms. She was soon put in charge of the index, and by the end of the war was responsible for the Naval Section's Records department. Tessa Dunlop later described her as one of the women promoted from the routine clerical and indexing roles often assigned to women at Bletchley Park, and as head of Naval Indexing.

Her colleagues and friends at Bletchley included Sarah Norton, later Sarah Baring, and Jean Campbell-Harris, later Jean Barker, Baroness Trumpington. Gibson also acted in Bletchley Park's amateur dramatic society, where she met her future husband, Jim Rose, then an RAF officer working in Hut 3 on intelligence reports from decrypted German air force messages.

== Post-war work ==
Gibson and Rose married in January 1946. They lived in Kensington, and later spent much of the 1950s in Zurich, where Jim Rose was founder-director of the International Press Institute. They had two children.

Rose did not resume her acting career immediately after the war. According to her later account, her husband thought that stage work would keep them on opposite schedules, and she chose family life over a return to the theatre.

When the family returned to London in the early 1960s, Rose became a school counsellor at a secondary school in Paddington. Her work included supporting children whose parents had arrived from the Caribbean as part of the Windrush generation. She later said that this work was more important to her than her wartime service at Bletchley Park.

After retiring from school counselling, Rose became a trustee of the National Society for the Prevention of Cruelty to Children, serving as vice-chair from 1988 to 1993, before becoming chairman of the Stroke Association.

In the late 1990s, Rose and her husband were interviewed for the Channel 4 television series Station X, in which they spoke publicly about their wartime work at Bletchley Park.

== Later acting and public recognition ==
After Jim Rose's death in 1999, the actor Sam Beazley encouraged Pamela Rose to take classes at The Actors Centre in Covent Garden. In 2002 she returned to professional theatre in Peter Hall's production of Oscar Wilde's Lady Windermere's Fan. She appeared as Lady Jedburgh in the Theatre Royal Haymarket run, and Theatricalia also records her as a temporary replacement for Googie Withers as the Duchess of Berwick.

She continued acting into her 90s, before failing eyesight forced her to stop. Rose was the guest on BBC Radio 4's Desert Island Discs in 2015. She died on 17 October 2021, aged 103.
