= Thornely Gibson =

British singer, stockbroker and intelligence reporter (1883–1969)

- Gibson, c. 1913
- Born: Thornely Carbutt Gibson; 11 August 1883
- Died: 17 March 1969 (aged 85)
- Education: Charterhouse School; New College, Oxford
- Occupations: Singer, stockbroker, Army officer, intelligence reporter
- Known for: Bolshevism in Germany memorandum (1919)
- Spouse: Elizabeth "Dolly" Wetzlar
- Children: Patrick Gibson, Baron Gibson and Pamela Rose

Thornely Gibson (Thornely Carbutt Gibson; 11 August 1883 – 17 March 1969) was a British bass-baritone singer, stockbroker and Irish Guards officer. After the First World War, he carried out reporting missions in Germany on behalf of the Secret Intelligence Service (SIS), using his singing career as cover. His 1919 memorandum Bolshevism in Germany, which warned that hunger under the Allied blockade was pushing Germany towards revolution, was circulated to the War Cabinet as paper G.T. 7092 by Winston Churchill as Secretary of State for War, and led to a meeting with the Prime Minister, David Lloyd George.

Gibson later served on the Austrian Section of the Reparation Commission in Vienna before returning to the City of London as a stockbroker. He was the father of Patrick Gibson, Baron Gibson, chairman of Pearson plc and the Arts Council of Great Britain, and of the actress and Bletchley Park veteran Pamela Rose.

== Early life and singing career ==
Gibson was the son of Arthur B. Gibson, an architect of Newcastle upon Tyne. He was educated at Charterhouse School, where he was both a junior and senior scholar, and later became a scholar of New College, Oxford, taking a first class in Moderations. The Charterhouse Register lists his occupation as "Singer".

Gibson performed publicly from 1911. A review in the Oxford Magazine of the Eights Week concert praised his performance of Peter Cornelius's aria Die Vätergruft for baritone and unaccompanied chorus, noting his "fine voice and really artistic singing".

On 16 May 1913, he gave a recital at Bechstein Hall, now Wigmore Hall, with the pianist Edwin Fischer. The programme advertised him as a bass-baritone and included works by Bach, Dvořák and Beethoven.

== Military service ==
Gibson joined the 3rd Volunteer Battalion of the 5th Northumberland Fusiliers in 1902 and resigned his commission in 1905.

During the First World War, he served with the Irish Guards as a lieutenant and acting captain. The casualty appendix to Rudyard Kipling's regimental history records a "T. C. Gibson" of the Irish Guards as wounded twice, on 25 September 1916 and 13 September 1917.

== Intelligence reporting ==
After the war, Gibson was based in Switzerland and provided SIS with reports obtained on concert tours inside Germany.

=== Bolshevism in Germany (1919) ===
In early 1919, Gibson travelled in Germany, visiting Munich, Berlin, Cassel, Frankfurt, Heidelberg, Karlsruhe, Baden-Baden and Offenburg. He adopted the cover identity of a "German-American, recently returned from 4 years' internment in England".

His information came from official Spartacist and Bolshevik reports obtained through Dr R. Weismann of the Landgericht Department in Berlin, and from direct conversations during his travels.

On 4 April 1919, Gibson sent a handwritten report to Philip Kerr, private secretary to the Prime Minister, David Lloyd George, warning that Germany risked political collapse if the Allied blockade was not relaxed. Churchill circulated the report to the War Cabinet on 10 April 1919 as an interim report on "the influence and growth of Bolshevism in Germany", describing Gibson as "an officer recently returned from Berlin".

Gibson reported that among the poorer classes "the danger of Germany embracing Bolshevism is both real and imminent", and that the population of Berlin was "literally starving" with "a feeling of apathetic despair". He recommended supplies of food, the reopening of factories, and the import of raw materials to "combat the ever-increasing influence of Bolshevism".

Gibson reported into the circle around Sir Maurice Hankey. After returning to Paris on 23 April 1919, during the Paris Peace Conference, he was given access to Lloyd George and argued, at a breakfast meeting with the Prime Minister and Lord Robert Cecil, for partial relaxation of the blockade before Germany signed the peace settlement. Newton describes Gibson's reporting as a source of contention within the British government, with senior military and Foreign Office officials questioning his credibility and analysis.

== Austria and the Reparation Commission ==
By early 1921, Gibson was Acting British Representative on the Austrian Section of the Reparation Commission in Vienna. In December 1920, the Austrian finance minister had requested permission to use state-owned artworks, including the Gobelin tapestries, as collateral for emergency food loans.

Gibson objected to the proposal. He warned that a forced sale would "flood an already depressed art market" and noted that the legal ownership of the former imperial collections remained "a problem of extreme intricacy".

== Later life ==
Following his diplomatic and intelligence work, Gibson returned to the City of London as a junior partner at Schwab & Snelling, stockbrokers, of 5 Throgmorton Avenue.

== Personal life ==
On 23 October 1913, Gibson married Elizabeth "Dolly" Anne Augusta Wetzlar (1892–1978), daughter of Moritz Benedikt Julius Wetzlar and the suffragist Adela Coit, and stepdaughter of the ethical movement leader Stanton Coit. Newspaper coverage described the wedding as a "suffragist form of marriage" because the bride was not asked to promise to "obey" her husband. Later syndicated reports said that the ceremony omitted the words "obey" and "serve" from the Anglican marriage service, and described Wetzlar as "the first bride, it is said, to make a practical protest" against "moral indignities to women" in the service.

They had two children:

- Patrick Gibson, Baron Gibson (1916–2004), financier and chairman of Pearson plc, the Arts Council of Great Britain and the National Trust.
- Pamela Rose (1917–2021), actress and wartime head of indexing in Naval Hut 4 at Bletchley Park.

Gibson died on 17 March 1969 after a long illness.
