= Clive Loehnis =

Sir Clive Loehnis KCMG (24 August 1902 – 23 May 1992) was a director of the British signals intelligence agency, GCHQ, a post he held from 1960 to 1964.

== Early life and education ==
Loehnis was born in 1902 in Chelsea, London, son of barrister Herman William Loehnis, who was born in New York but was raised in England and became a naturalised British citizen, and Vera Geraldine, née Wood. The Loehnis family originated in Hamburg; his paternal grandfather had been an entrepreneur in Saint Petersburg. Loehnis attended Lockers Park School.

== Career ==
After school Loehnis became a Royal Navy officer cadet, training at the Royal Naval College, Osborne, and graduating from the Royal Naval College, Dartmouth, and the Royal Naval College, Greenwich. He became qualified in signals in 1928 and left the Navy in 1935. In 1938 he returned to the Signals Division of the Admiralty, where he earned the silver oak leaves of a commander before retiring in 1942 and going into the Naval Intelligence Division. When he was demobilised after the war, he joined GCHQ, at that time a semi-covert division of the Foreign Office.

Loehnis was appointed deputy to Sir Eric Jones in 1954. When Jones retired in 1960, Loehnis was promoted to the directorship, which he held until 1964. He was knighted in 1962. He served as deputy chairman of the Civil Service Selection Board in 1967.

== Personal life ==
In 1929, Loehnis married Rosemary Beryl (1909-2006), daughter of Major Hon. Robert Nathaniel Dudley Ryder (1882-1917), of the 8th Hussars; her paternal grandfather was the banker Henry Ryder, 4th Earl of Harrowby. They had two sons- one of whom died very young- and a daughter. After leaving GCHQ Loehnis retired to Belgravia, where he died in May 1992.

Government offices
Preceded by Sir Eric Jones	Director of GCHQ; 1960–1964	Succeeded by Sir Leonard Hooper
