= Edward Travis =

British cryptographer and intelligence officer

Sir Edward Travis KCMG CBE
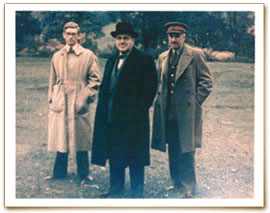
- Photograph of British cryptoanalysts Harry Hinsley, Sir Edward Travis, and John Tiltman in Washington, November 1945
- Born: Edward Wilfred Harry Travis; 24 September 1888
- Died: 23 April 1956 (aged 67)
- Occupations: Cryptographer; Intelligence officer
- Years active: 1906–1952
- Known for: Operational head of Bletchley Park during World War II; later head of GCHQ
- Notable work: BRUSA Agreement (1943); UKUSA Agreement (1946)
- Awards: CBE (1936); KCMG (1944); US Medal for Merit (1946)

Sir Edward Wilfred Harry Travis KCMG CBE (24 September 1888 – 23 April 1956) was a British cryptographer and intelligence officer, becoming the operational head of Bletchley Park during World War II, and later the head of GCHQ.

== Career ==
Educated locally in Blackheath, London, Travis joined the Royal Navy in 1906 as a Paymaster officer, and served on HMS Iron Duke. From 1916 to 1918, he worked on Navy cyphers. He retired in 1921, having reached the rank of Paymaster Lieutenant-Commander, and was advanced to Paymaster Commander in 1927.

By 1925, he was in charge of security at the Government Code and Cypher School and deputy to Alastair Denniston. Travis replaced Denniston as the operational head of Bletchley Park in February 1942, although both took the title of Deputy Director. This may have happened because in October 1941 four senior cryptanalysts, Alan Turing, Gordon Welchman, Conel Hugh O'Donel Alexander, and Stuart Milner-Barry had written directly to Churchill, over the head of Denniston, to alert Churchill to the fact that a shortage of staff at Bletchley Park was preventing them from deciphering many messages, to the detriment of the war effort. These cryptanalysts, known as the Wicked Uncles, had also praised the "energy and foresight" of Commander Travis while omitting mention of Denniston. However, Christopher Grey notes that other factors also contributed to Travis' promotion, including a personality clash between Denniston and Stewart Menzies, the Director of the Government Code and Cypher School (GC&CS) and the head of the Secret Intelligence Service, as well as an ongoing and unresolved management crisis in Hut 3. Turing's biographer says that after the change, Travis "presided over an administrative revolution" reconciling the management structure to the production process.

Travis was involved with William Friedman in working on the 1943 BRUSA Agreement and the subsequent 1946 UKUSA Agreement, which forms the basis for all signal intelligence cooperation between the US National Security Agency (NSA) and the UK Government Communications Headquarters (GCHQ) to this day. He remained head of the post-war successor to GC&CS, GCHQ, and served as its director until 15 April 1952, when he was replaced by Eric Jones.

Concerning awards, Travis was appointed CBE in 1936, and KCMG in June 1944. He was the first non-American to be awarded the United States of America Medal for Merit, on 12 January 1946.

Government offices
| Preceded by Alastair Denniston | Deputy Director (Services) of the Government Code and Cypher School, later Director of GC&CS, later Director of GCHQ; February 1942 – 15 April 1952 | Succeeded by Sir Eric Malcolm Jones |
