= Gideon Lester =

British artistic director and dramaturg (born 1972)

- Born: 1972 (age 53–54); London, England
- Education: University of Oxford; Harvard University
- Occupations: Artistic director; dramaturg; curator; creative producer
- Employer: Bard College
- Parent: Anthony Lester, Baron Lester of Herne Hill
- Relatives: Maya Lester (sister)

Gideon Lester (born 1972) is a British artistic director, dramaturg, curator, and creative producer. He is currently artistic director of the Richard B. Fisher Center for the Performing Arts at Bard College, senior curator of the OSUN Center for Human Rights and the Arts, and a professor at Bard. He has collaborated with a broad range of American and international artists, including Romeo Castellucci, Justin Vivian Bond, Krystian Lupa, Peter Sellars, Tania El Khoury, Anna Deavere Smith, and Neil Gaiman.

== Early life and education ==
Gideon Lester was born in London in 1972 and studied English at Oxford University. In 1995, he was awarded a Fulbright grant and Frank Knox Memorial Fellowship to study dramaturgy at the A.R.T. Institute for Advanced Theatre Training at Harvard.

== Career ==
Lester co-curated the interdisciplinary arts festival "Crossing the Line" from 2013 to 2018. He was Acting Artistic Director of the American Repertory Theatre (A.R.T.) from 2007 to 2009 and taught at the Columbia University School of the Arts, where he created the Arts Collaboration Lab.

He taught dramaturgy at the American Repertory Theatre and playwriting at Harvard.

He was the A.R.T.'s associate artistic director from 2002 until 2006 and was resident dramaturg at the A.R.T. for five years prior.

His stage translations include Marivaux's Island of Slaves (directed by Robert Woodruff at the A.R.T. in 2006) and La Dispute, Brecht's Mother Courage, Büchner's Woyzeck, and two texts by the French playwright Michel Vinaver, King and Overboard. His play Amerika or the Disappearance, adapted from Franz Kafka's first novel, was staged at the American Repertory Theatre in 2005, directed by Dominique Serrand. His other adaptations include The Master and Margarita after Bulgakov's novel, staged by Janos Szasz at Bard Fisher Center in 2013; Wings of Desire (A.R.T. and Toneelgroep Amsterdam, 2006), Anne Frank and Enter the Actress, a one-woman show that he devised for Claire Bloom.

In 2015, he produced Daniel Fish's production of Oklahoma! at the Fisher Center; it subsequently transferred to St. Ann's Warehouse in Brooklyn in 2018, and opened on Broadway at Circle in the Square in 2019, where it won a Tony Award for Best Revival of a Musical. He frequently collaborates with the choreographer Pam Tanowitz, and commissioned her 2018 performance Four Quartets, based on T. S. Eliot's poems of the same name, with music by Kaija Saariaho, design based on the paintings of Brice Marden, and narration by Kathleen Chalfant. Four Quartets subsequently performed at the Barbican in London.

== Personal life ==
Lester is the son of politician and human rights barrister, Anthony Lester, Baron Lester of Herne Hill QC, and is the brother of Maya Lester KC.
