= Eric Malcolm Jones =

British intelligence officer (1907–1986)

Sir Eric Malcolm Jones KCMG CB CBE (27 April 1907 – 24 December 1986) was a British intelligence officer who was director of the British signals intelligence agency, GCHQ from 1952 to 1960.

== Career ==
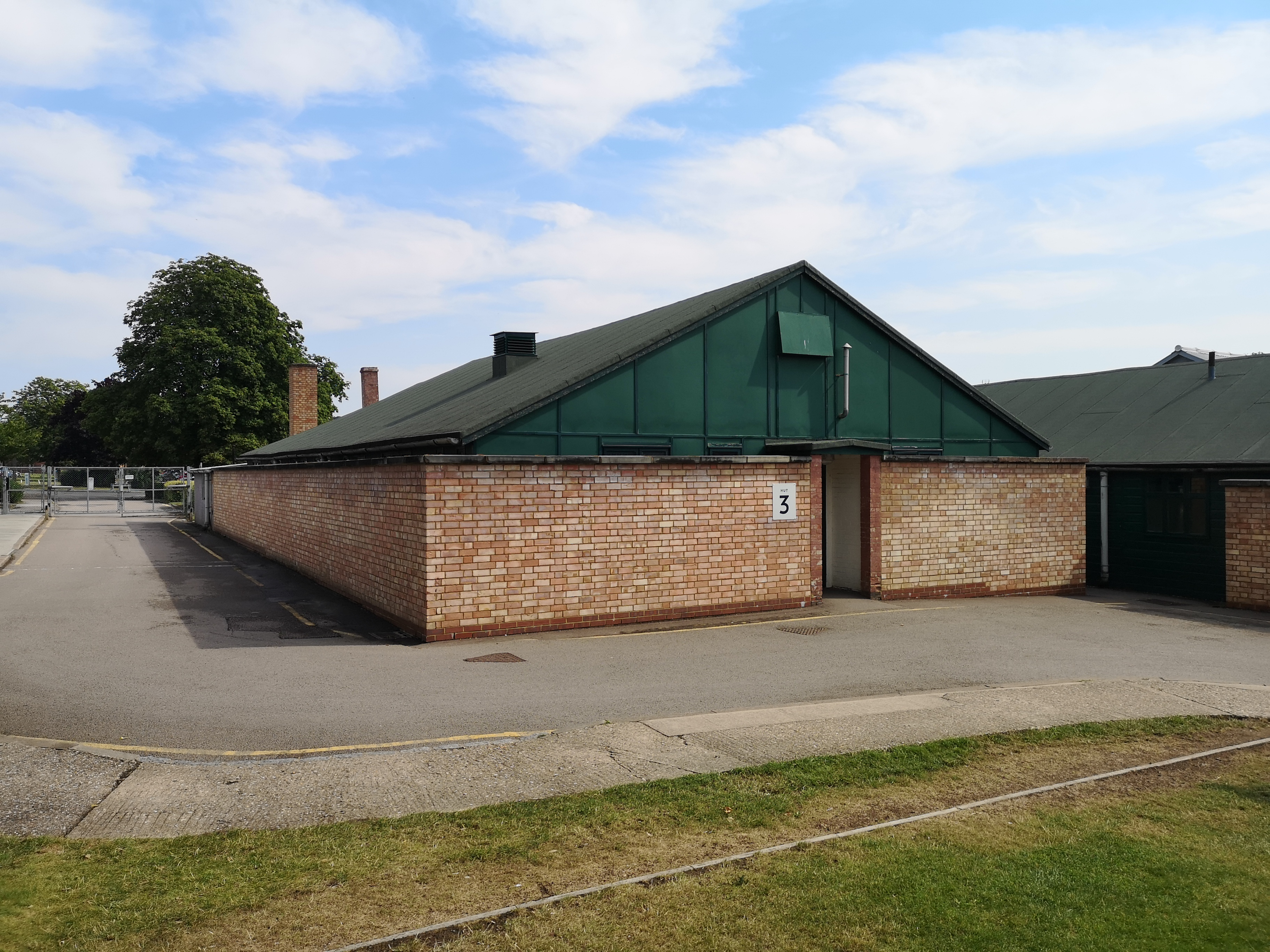
Hut 3 with a blast wall rebuilt by Bletchley Park Trust

Born in Buxton in Derbyshire and educated at King's School, Macclesfield only to the age 15; for twenty years he worked in the family textile business in Macclesfield, and then in his own textile agency. He enlisted as a reservist in the Royal Air Force in 1940, and was posted to Air Ministry Intelligence. Sent to Bletchley Park in early 1942, he produced a report on the "dysfunctional" Hut 3; Edward Travis was so impressed that he was promoted to Group Captain and placed in charge of the hut. At Bletchley Park he spoke with "Cheshire vowels" and was not a "university man" so the "intellectual snobberies of Bletchley Park" worked against him; he was referred to as "The Manchester Businessman", and was believed to have something to do with biscuits!

But he was a success at solving the Army-Air force feud at Hut 3. From April 1943, Jones was the head of Hut 3, which was responsible for intelligence on the Wehrmacht and Luftwaffe. Unlike the better-known code breakers, Jones did not bring a background in mathematics or cryptography. During the early phases of D-Day preparations, "Jones was sent in to investigate and wrote a report recognising there needed to be a multi-services approach. It is a report that won the war in many ways," according to David Kenyon, research historian and author of the 2019 book Bletchley Park and D-Day.

After the war, Jones was sent to Washington D.C. as representative of British Signals Intelligence. He was made deputy director of GCHQ in 1950, and director from April 1952 until 1960. Under Jones leadership, the intelligence material compiled by GCHQ was of significant benefit during the Suez Crisis of 1955; Jones received congratulations from Foreign Secretary Selwyn Lloyd.

In retirement he became a non-executive director of Simon Engineering.

=== Accolades ===
In April 2019, additional information about Jones' work at Bletchley Park was revealed by David Kenyon, preliminary to an exhibition, starting on 2019 the anniversary of D-Day, that would highlight Jones's contribution leading up to events in June 1944. The exhibition, D-day: Interception, Intelligence, Invasion, details the preparations for the landings and reveals Jones’s essential interpretation and cataloguing system for the massive amounts of data from the team that was intercepting intelligence after cracking coded messages from the Germans using the Enigma machines. "Jones’s skill at putting together all the information coming in was crucial", said Kenyon.

Peronel Craddock, Head of Collections and Exhibitions at Bletchley Park offered this comment in an interview: "We really can say that Jones, by leading his team inside Hut 3, was at least equally important to Turing in this part of the story. And there we are talking about someone recently declared by the BBC as Britain’s leading icon".

Government offices
Preceded by Sir Edward Travis	Director of GCHQ; April 1952 – 1960	Succeeded by Sir Clive Loehnis
