= Halima Begum =

Bangladeshi-British charity executive

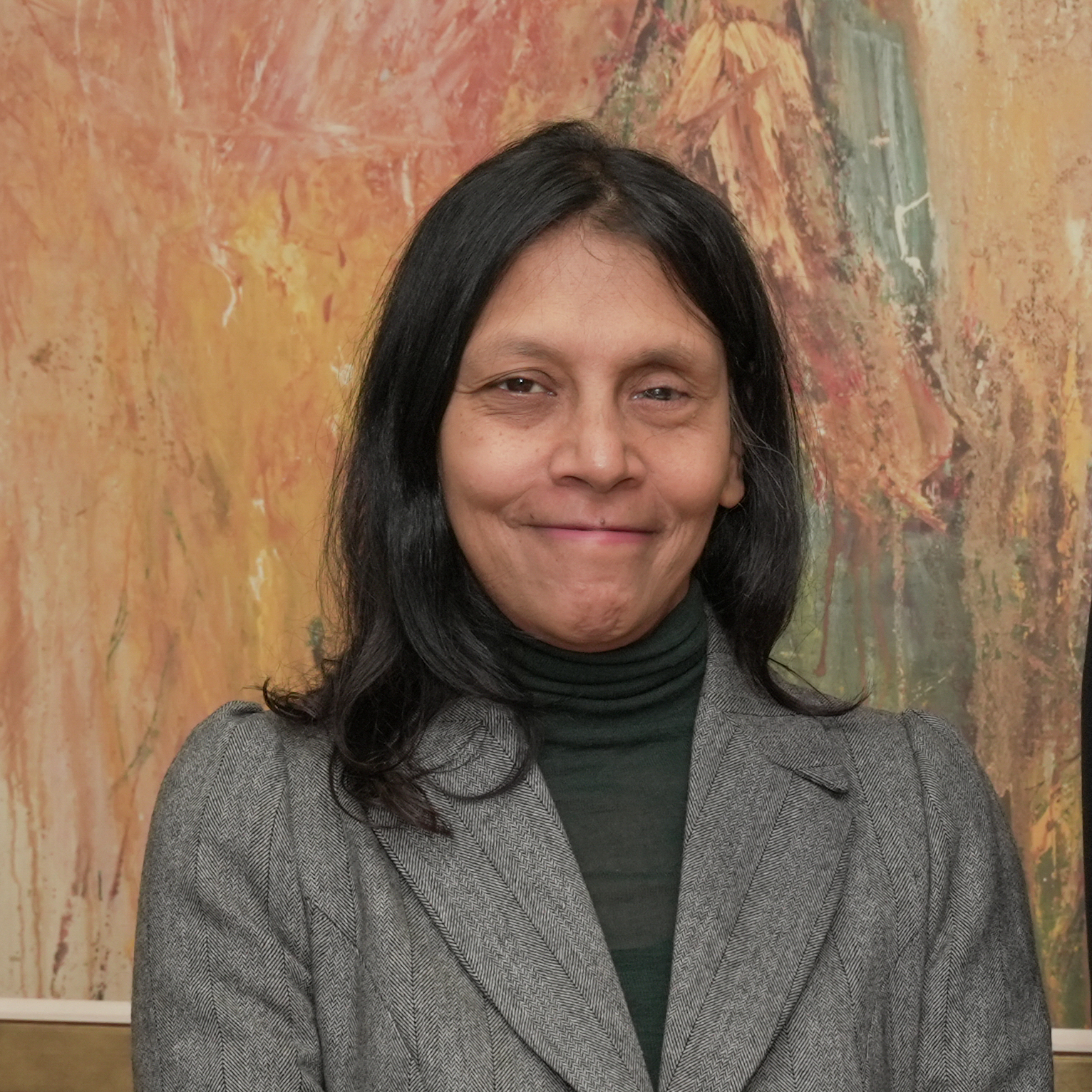
- in 2024
- Education: London School of Economics, Queen Mary University of London
- Occupation: chief executive of Oxfam (dismissed in 2025)

Halima Begum is a Bangladeshi-British charity executive, who was chief executive of Oxfam UK until December 2025. She previously worked for the Department for International Development, the British Council, ActionAid and the Runnymede Trust.

== Early life and education ==
Begum was born in Sylhet, Bangladesh in the aftermath of the Liberation War. Her parents were working-class migrants who experienced homelessness during Begum's early childhood in London. Due to discriminatory restrictions on Commonwealth British citizens accessing public services including housing, the family joined the British-Bangladeshi squatter movement and lived in a series of derelict buildings in the East End of London, one condemned for demolition as a result of bomb damage caused by the Luftwaffe during the Blitz. With her parents eventually offered permanent public housing in the late 1970s, Begum was raised on Brick Lane in the London Borough of Tower Hamlets. She attended Thomas Buxton Primary School and Central Foundation Girls School. As a teenager, Begum co-founded Women Unite Against Racism to combat the rising incidence of racial discrimination and Islamophobia in East London, including Millwall and the Isle of Dogs. In the early 1990s, she was active in the fight against the extreme rightwing National Front and Derek Beackon, the party's first elected councillor; she was physically assaulted several times. She took her undergraduate degree in Government and History, and her master's degree in International Relations at the London School of Economics, before completing her PhD at Queen Mary University of London.

== Disability ==
As a young child Begum had a rare and debilitating medical condition that led to the surgical removal of her left eye. In an episode of the BBC World Service series Emotional Baggage, dedicated to her life and experiences of migration, Begum recounted to host Professor Henrietta Bowden-Jones how the NHS initially refused to offer her parents access to treatment for their child, despite the family's status as British citizens. Begum described to the BBC how her father, a textile factory worker, felt he had no choice left but to hand custody of his two-year-old daughter to the Imam of Brick Lane Mosque. The Imam, the mosque congregation and a still relatively small London Bangladeshi community immediately organised a campaign to secure Begum the treatment she required. Though surgeons at St Bartholomew's hospital were unable to save her left eye, Begum retains some residual vision on her right side and to this day remains under the care of the Moorfields Eye Hospital. In 2022, the Shaw Trust placed her in the top 100 disabled people in the UK.

== Career ==
Early in her career Begum worked for ActionAid. In 2012 she was appointed Director for Education at the British Council, responsible for shaping education strategies across East Asia. In 2017 she was recruited to the role of Vice President of the LEGO Foundation and in 2020 was appointed Chief Executive of the Runnymede Trust. In 2023, she stepped down from the Runnymede Trust to re-join ActionAid as CEO. She left ActionAid after four months to become chief executive of Oxfam, where she was forced to resign in December 2025 after an external inquiry found serious problems with her behaviour and decision making. She subsequently alleged racism, sexism and antisemitism at the charity, and announced her intention to file a claim against it at employment tribunal.

== Covid response ==
Through the COVID-19 pandemic Begum advocated for the expansion of public health measures to support ethnic minority and working class communities. This was a result of the significant and disproportionate number of Covid deaths among those cohorts. Begum's recommendations included increased Covid testing, vaccination priority and a targeted vaccine rollout for BAME groups. Her research interests during the pandemic extended to an examination of the impact of Covid on Muslim patients fasting during the month of Ramadan, and the necessity of including ethnicity as an independent Covid risk factor in the shaping of public health policies. In February 2021, Chief Medical Officer Chris Witty announced that ethnicity would be considered a Covid risk factor in the UK, along with social deprivation and body mass index. This step saw two million more British citizens encouraged to shield and a further 800,000 fast-tracked for vaccination.

== Personal life ==
Begum grew up in Brick Lane within a large Bangladeshi community, the third of six children. Her father, Mohammed Abdul Kadir, was an East End textile worker who according to Begum returned to Bangladesh to help the resistance during the Liberation War. Kadir's name is believed to be among the original signatories on the lease of the Brick Lane Mosque, a historical landmark formerly known as the Jamme Masjid Mosque and, in previous incarnations from its construction in 1743, both a church and synagogue. Begum has spoken publicly about her parents' homelessness during her early childhood and their subsequent involvement in the Bangladeshi squatter movement in 1970s London. In a BBC interview with Robert Carlyle, Begum described the considerable racial and physical abuse to which she was subjected as a child by the National Front, which maintained a bookstand outside her parents' home on Brick Lane.

In various discussions on BBC Radio 4 with interviewers including Professor Henrietta Bowden-Jones and Samira Ahmed, Begum has described being taken to school with her mother and siblings, dressed in a saree and having to push through the Neo-nazi extremists outside the family home. She called this journey, "A daily act of resistance by four little British-Bangladeshi children". When she was 23 in 1997 one of her brothers, Abdul Samad, was murdered after being pressured to become involved in a dispute between rival curry house proprietors.
