= Runnymede Trust =

Race equality campaign group in the United Kingdom

The Runnymede Trust is a British race equality and civil rights think tank. It was founded by Jim Rose and Anthony Lester as an independent source for generating intelligence for a multi-ethnic Britain through research, network building, leading debate and policy engagement.

The Trust began operations in 1968, the year of two major events in global and British race relations: the assassination of Martin Luther King Jr and Enoch Powell's "Rivers of Blood" speech. Runnymede Trust has played a leading role in the UK's national debate around race, helping shape legislation including the 1971 and 1976 Race Relations Acts, introducing popular usage of the term "Islamophobia" with its 1996 Commission on British Muslims, and more recently its work informing civil society's debate of issues including the 2021 Sewell Report and the Nationality and Borders Act 2022.

The Trust had been led since 2020 by Halima Begum as director and chief executive, until she stepped down in 2023. Its chairman is Sir Clive Jones.

== Policy areas ==
Since 1968 Runnymede Trust has undertaken research in a wide variety of policy areas related to race and civil rights including:

- COVID-19 and health inequalities
- School curriculum reform
- Immigration policy and practice, including the hostile environment policy and the Windrush scandal
- Education policy
- Islamophobia, antisemitism and other forms of religious discrimination
- Criminal justice policy
- Financial inclusion and ethnicity
- Black and Minority Ethnic older people
- The Windrush scandal.

The Runnymede Trust has acted as secretariat for the all-party parliamentary group on Race and Community since the start of 2010, and holds the secretariat of the UK Race and Europe Network (UKREN), a UK-wide network of more than 200 organisations involved in race relations and combating racism at a local, national or European level.

== Research and campaigns ==
=== COVID-19 ===
Runnymede has been a leading source of research and data confirming the disproportionate impact of COVID-19 on Black and Minority Ethnic communities in Great Britain. Its survey of 2,585 adults, Over-exposed and Under-protected identified Bangladeshi and Black African communities as most vulnerable, and warned that important public safety and economic contingency measures – including "Stay Home" messaging and furlough advice – were not reaching BAME communities. A statement from the Department of Health said, "We know that Covid-19 has had a disproportionate effect on people from BAME backgrounds ... and the equalities minister is now taking forward vital work to tackle these disparities and protect our most vulnerable communities from the impact of the virus."

In October 2020, Runnymede published a blog with the Institute for Public Policy Research calling on the government to set out a comprehensive strategy to mitigate ethnic inequalities for the subsequent months of the pandemic. Their research suggested this strategy should tackle two key inequalities. Firstly, because almost all minority ethnic groups are more likely to get COVID-19, the government should put in place measures to better protect these communities and support people to isolate. Secondly, the consequences and harms associated with COVID-19 for most minority ethnic groups, once they have caught it, are more severe. This means the government must ensure that minority ethnic groups have better access to treatment than they currently do.

=== Windrush scandal ===
Runnymede took a prominent role during the unravelling of the Windrush scandal and were acknowledged by the UK Government in bringing the injustice to light. Working with the Joint Council for the Welfare of Immigrants, Runnymede organised a meeting of 14 Caribbean High Commissioners with Downing Street officials and the Prime Minister at the time, Theresa May. This meeting was organised in parallel to another meeting in Parliament, where 5 of those citizens directly affected were able to discuss their treatment with 40 parliamentarians, including the Immigration Minister and Leader of the Opposition. Runnymede was subsequently named as the only civil society representative on the Windrush Lessons Learned Review Advisory Group and one of The Guardian's five Christmas appeal charities.

=== School curriculum ===
==== "Our Migration Story" ====
In 2016 Runnymede launched "Our Migration Story: The Making of Britain", a collaboration with academics based at the universities of Cambridge and Manchester. The website is designed to support teachers and students studying migration to Britain and aims to present the 'often untold stories of the generations of migrants who came to and shaped the British Isles' through interactive source material spanning four time-period categories: AD43–1500; 1500–1750; 1750–1900; 1900–2000s. The website also gives access to multiple teaching resources including lesson plans and classroom activities.

"Our Migration Story" was awarded the Royal Historical Society Public History Prize for Best Online Resource in 2018, named as a Research Champion in the 2017 Community Integration Awards and won The Guardian University Award for Research Impact in 2019.

==== "Lit in Colour" ====
In October 2020, Runnymede and Penguin Books launched "Lit in Colour", a research project to better understand the gaps in the teaching and learning of books by ethnic minority writers in UK primary and secondary schools, and produce recommendations for change. The completed research was released in June 2021, and made recommendations to support inclusive teaching and learning in schools which were addressed to teachers, parents, publishers and teacher training providers.

=== Essays on class and race ===
In 2009, Runnymede published a collection of essays by leading thinkers on race and class, considering the relationship between social class and race equality. They argued that the white working class is discriminated against on a range of different fronts, but they are not discriminated against for being white.

=== Antisemitism ===
In 1992, The Runnymede Trust set up a committee to examine antisemitism in the UK. In 1994, after two years of research, the committee published its final report, A Very Light Sleeper – The persistence & dangers of antisemitism. Their second report on antisemitism, entitled Facing Antisemitism: The Struggle for Safety and Solidarity, was published in 2025. Antisemitism scholar David Seymour criticized the report, describing it as an epistle to the Jews that "predicates the fight against antisemitism on the correction of patterns of Jewish thinking and behaviour".

=== Faith schools ===
Runnymede published research in 2008 concluding that faith schools in England must become schools for all children in order to encourage interaction between people of different faiths and ethnicities. The report was published after a two-year investigation into the impact that faith schools have on community cohesion.

=== Islamophobia ===
In 1996, Runnymede established a Commission on British Muslims and Islamophobia, chaired by Gordon Conway, the Vice-Chancellor of the University of Sussex, and published Islamophobia: A Challenge for us All in 1997. The report, which was launched by Labour Home Secretary Jack Straw, was largely responsible for popularising the term Islamophobia in British political discourse.

=== Commission on the Future of Multi-Ethnic Britain ===
In 1997, Runnymede established the Commission on the Future of Multi-Ethnic Britain to consider the political and cultural implications of the changing ethnic diversity of the UK. The commission was chaired by Lord Professor Bhikhu Parekh. The commission published its findings and recommendations in October 2000. Two-thirds of its recommendations were accepted by the government.

=== Legal challenge against government appointments during the COVID pandemic ===
Amid the UK's COVID national emergency in November 2020, the Runnymede Trust filed judicial review proceedings against the government in the High Court. The case was brought in the public interest to challenge, under the Equality Act 2010, the legality and appropriateness of the appointment by then Health Secretary Matt Hancock of his friend Baroness Dido Harding to lead the National Institute for Health Protection, and her friend Mike Coupe to lead NHS Test and Trace. In two articles published by The Times newspaper, the trust was criticised for undertaking the case in partnership with the Good Law Project, and for alleged political bias in its repudiation of the controversial and widely discredited report published by the Commission on Race and Ethnic Disparities. However, in a preliminary finding on legal standing in 2021, the High Court ruled that the Runnymede Trust had cause to bring the case both in terms of its charitable objectives and the public interest. In its verdict on the case issued in February 2022, the High Court under Lord Justice Singh ruled that Hancock had breached the Equality Act 2010 in his appointment of both Harding and Coupe.

== Senior staff ==
=== Chairpeople ===
- Sir Clive Jones CBE, 2009–
- Samir Shah, 1999–2009
- Diana Brittan, 1998–1999
- Trevor Phillips, 1993–1998
- Anthony Lester, 1991–1993
- Jim Rose, 1980–1990
- Jock Campbell, 1968–1980

=== Directors ===
- Dr. Shabna Begum, 2024–present
- Dr. Halima Begum, 2020–2023
- Dr. Omar Khan, 2014–2020
- Dr. Rob Berkeley, 2009–2014
- Michelynn Lafleche, 2001–2008
- Sukhvinder Stubbs 1996–2000
- Robin Richardson, 1991–1996
- Kenneth Leech, 1987–1991
- Ann Dummett, 1984–1987
- Usha Prashar, 1977–1984
- Tom Rees, 1975–1977
- David Stephen, 1973–1975
- Dipak Nandy, 1968–1973

== Partnerships ==
Runnymede has operated within ongoing partnerships alongside organisations working in intersecting fields. The most prominent of these are:

- Race On The Agenda (ROTA)
- CLASS: Centre for Labour and Social Studies
- Voice4Change
- University of Manchester and University of Cambridge
- Institute for Public Policy Research
- Penguin Books

== Funding ==
The Runnymede Trust is a registered charity under English law. In the past funding has been wide-ranging, from high-street banks to TV companies. The most significant donors are:

- Joseph Rowntree Charitable Trust
- Esmée Fairbairn Foundation
- Paul Hamlyn Foundation
- Unbound Philanthropy
- Barrow Cadbury Trust
- Lankelly Chase
