= Cryptogam =

Any plant or plant-like organism that reproduces by spores, without flowers or seeds

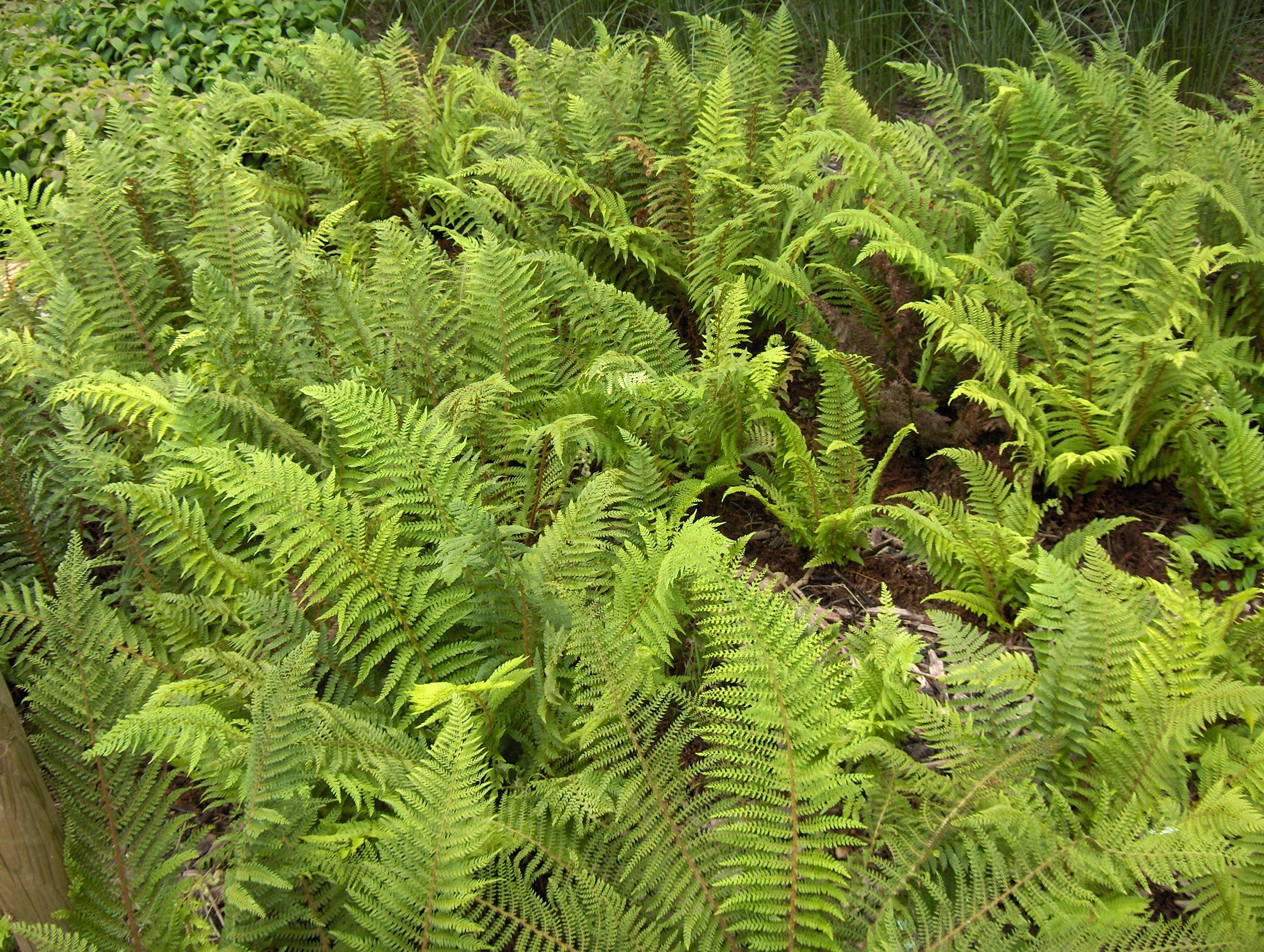
Polystichum setiferum, a fern

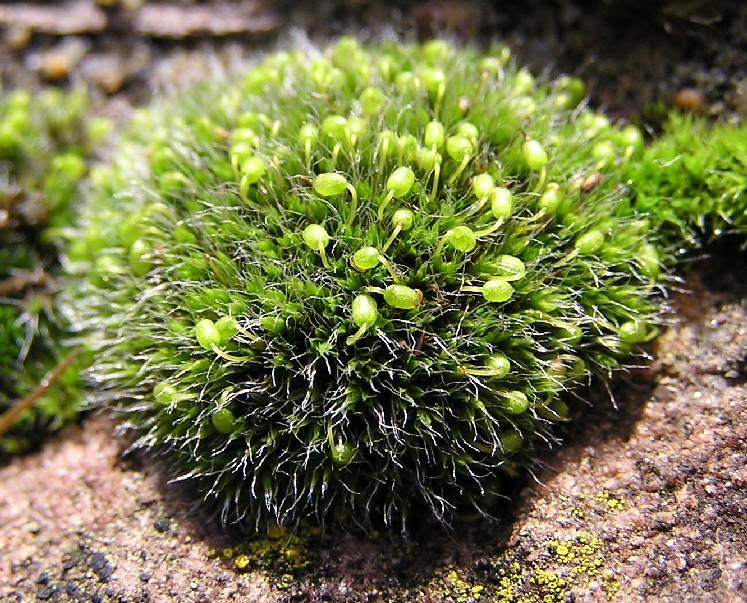
Grimmia pulvinata, a moss

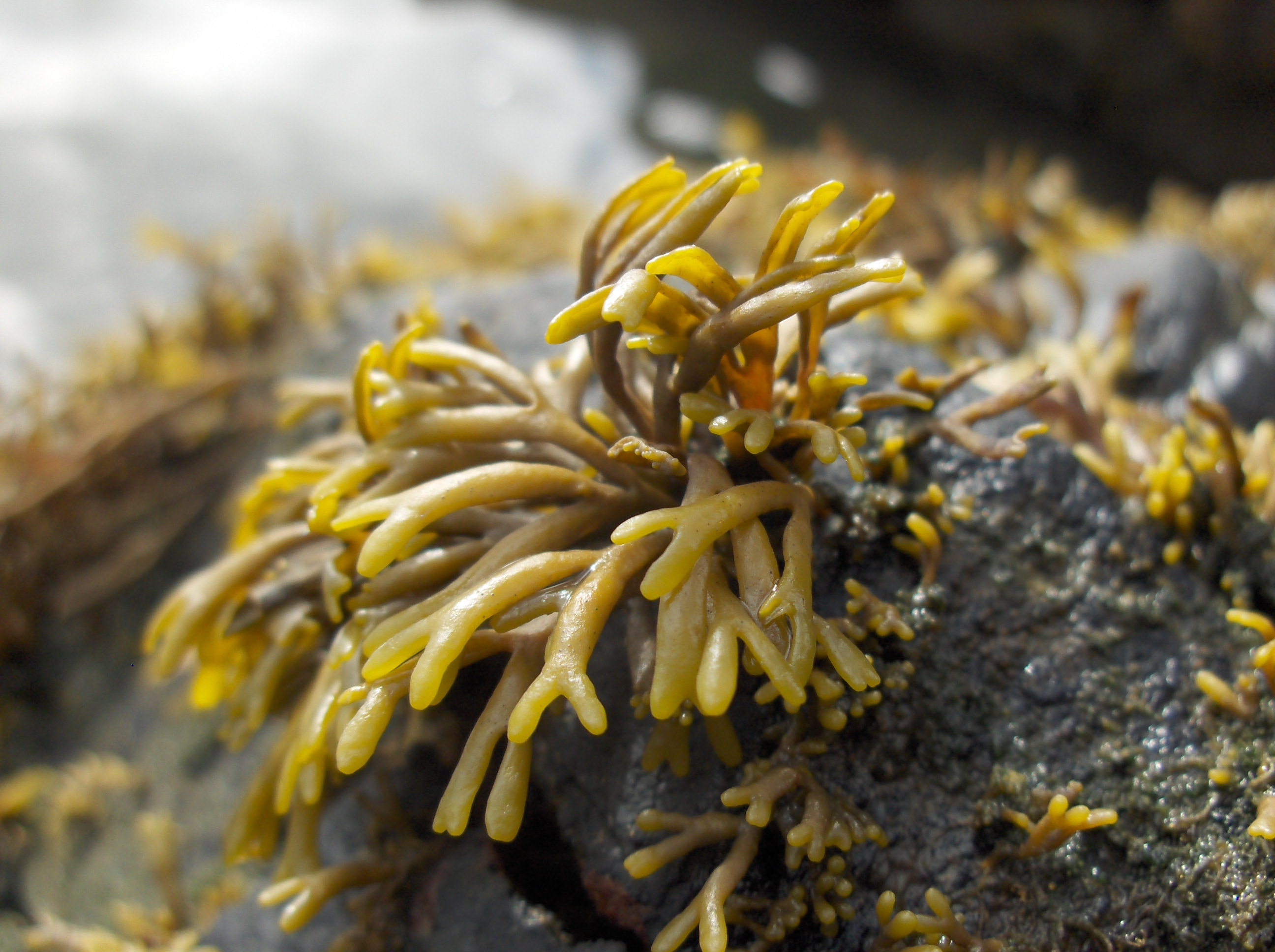
Pelvetia canaliculata, a brown alga

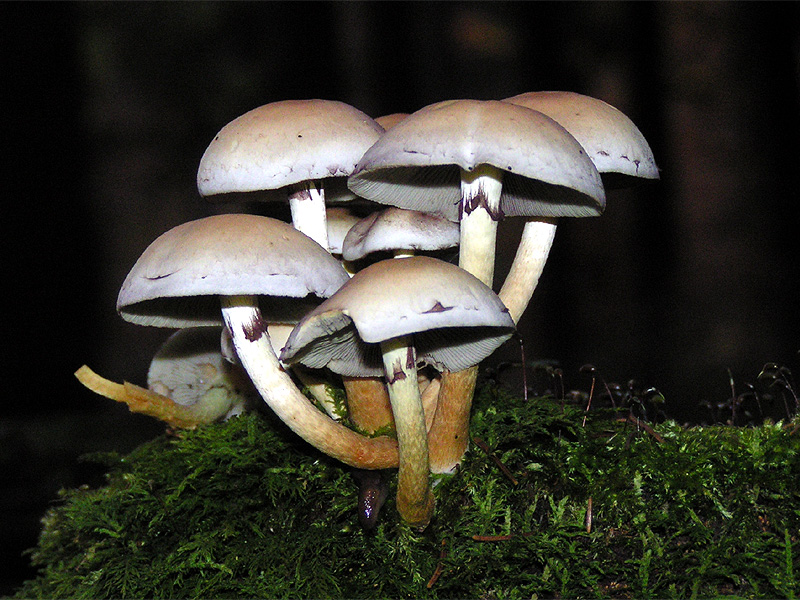
Hypholoma fasciculare, a fungus

A cryptogam (scientific name Cryptogamae) is a plant, in the broad sense of the word, or a plant-like organism that shares similar characteristics, such as being multicellular, photosynthetic, and primarily immobile, that reproduces via spores rather than through flowers or seeds.

This broader definition can include algae, fungi, and certain bacteria (like cyanobacteria), even though they may belong to different biological kingdoms.

== Taxonomy ==
The name Cryptogamae (from Ancient Greek κρυπτός (kruptós) 'hidden' and γαμέω (gaméō) 'to marry') means "hidden reproduction", meaning non-seed bearing plants. Other names, such as "thallophytes", "lower plants", and "spore plants" have occasionally been used.

As a group, Cryptogamae are paired with the Phanerogamae or Spermatophyta, the seed plants. At one time, the cryptogams were formally recognised as a group within the plant kingdom. In his system for classification of all known plants and animals, Carl Linnaeus (1707–1778) divided the plant kingdom into 24 classes, one of which was the "Cryptogamia". This included all plants with concealed reproductive organs. He divided Cryptogamia into four orders: Algae, Musci (bryophytes), Filices (ferns), and fungi, but it had also traditionally included slime molds, and Cyanophyta. The classification is now deprecated in Linnaean taxonomy. Cryptogams have been classified into three sub-kingdoms: Thallophyta, Bryophyta, and Pteridophyta.

Not all cryptogams are treated as part of the plant kingdom today; the fungi, in particular, are a separate kingdom, more closely related to animals than plants, while blue-green algae are a phylum of bacteria. Therefore, in contemporary plant systematics, "Cryptogamae" is not a taxonomically coherent group, but is polyphyletic. However, the names of all cryptogams are regulated by the International Code of Nomenclature for algae, fungi, and plants.

== In human culture ==
An apocryphal story: it is said that during World War II, the British Government Code and Cypher School recruited Geoffrey Tandy, a marine biologist expert in cryptogams, to Station X, Bletchley Park, when someone confused these with cryptograms. However, the story is a myth; though Tandy did indeed work at Bletchley, he was not recruited by mistake. At the time the field of cryptography was very new, and so it was typical to hire those with education and expertise in other fields.
