= Geoffrey Tandy =

Geoffrey A. Tandy
- Born: 1900
- Died: 1969 (aged 68–69)
- Occupations: marine biologist, broadcaster
- Known for: Work at Bletchley Park

Geoffrey A. Tandy (1900–1969) was a British marine biologist and broadcaster.

== Life ==
Tandy graduated from Oxford University in 1921, and pursued graduate studies at Birkbeck College, in the University of London. He was employed at the Natural History Museum in London from 1926 to 1948, specialising in the biology of algae, after which he worked for the British Foreign Office until 1954.

During the Second World War he joined the Royal Naval Volunteer Reserve and rose to the rank of Paymaster Commander. He served throughout the war at Bletchley Park in the Naval Section. In 1941 he was in charge of the research sub-section with responsibility for captured documents, and later he became Head of Technical Intelligence. In 1945 he became a member of TICOM (Technical Intelligence Committee).

A friend of T. S. Eliot, Tandy wrote a "Broadcasting Chronicle" for The Criterion, and was the first to broadcast Old Possum's Book of Practical Cats in 1937. During the Second World War he worked at Bletchley Park, allegedly invited there after the Ministry of Defence confused the word "cryptogamist" with "cryptogramist". Tandy's son Miles, who has researched his father’s life, remains sceptical about that claim. At Bletchley his technical expertise allowed him to salvage a waterlogged codebook which helped crack the Enigma cypher.

Genista McIntosh, Baroness McIntosh is Tandy's daughter by his second wife Maire McDermott. He had five children in total.

Tandy's papers are held at the Natural History Museum.
