= Harry Hinsley =

English cryptanalyst and historian (1918–1998)

Sir Harry Hinsley OBE FBA
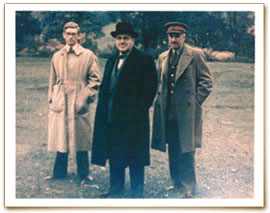
- British Cryptanalysis Harry Hinsley, Edward Travis, and John Tiltman
- Born: Francis Harry Hinsley; 26 November 1918; Walsall, Staffordshire, England
- Died: 16 February 1998 (aged 79); Cambridge, England
- Occupation: Historian
- Known for: Cryptography
- Spouse: Hilary Brett-Smith

Academic background
- Education: St John's College, Cambridge

Academic work
- Institutions: Cambridge University 1949–65
- Notable works: British Intelligence in the Second World War (1979–90); Codebreakers: The inside story of Bletchley Park (1993)

Sir Francis Harry Hinsley, OBE, FBA (26 November 1918 – 16 February 1998) was an English intelligence officer and historian. He worked at Bletchley Park during the Second World War and wrote widely on the history of international relations and British Intelligence during the Second World War. He was known as Harry Hinsley.

== Early life ==
Hinsley's father worked in the coal department of the Walsall Co-Op. His mother Emma Hinsley (née Adey) was a school caretaker and they lived in Birchills, in the parish of St Andrew's, Walsall. Harry was educated at Queen Mary's Grammar School, Walsall and, in 1937, won a scholarship to read history at St. John's College, Cambridge. He went on to be awarded a first in part one of the Historical Tripos.

In August 1939, Hinsley visited his girlfriend in the German city of Koblenz. Police required him to report to the police station daily. However, this requirement was waived following the signing of the German-Soviet Pact. A week later, Hinsley was advised by police via his girlfriend's parents to get out of Germany by "tomorrow at the latest". This enabled him to cross the Franco-German border before it was closed. He made the crossing at the bridge between Kehl and Strasbourg. Stripped of his Reichsmarks by German border guards without francs or sterling in exchange, Hinsley was left penniless. This led to his sleeping on a park bench in France. Hinsley hitch-hiked to Switzerland from where he returned to the United Kingdom. He made his return just before Britain declared war on Germany. In October 1939, while still at St. John's, he was summoned to an interview with Alastair Denniston, head of the Government Code and Cypher School (GC&CS), and was thereby recruited to Bletchley Park's naval section in Hut 4. Phoebe Senyard became his personal assistant. He abandoned his degree course and thereafter never completed it.

== Bletchley Park ==
At Bletchley Park, Hinsley studied the external characteristics of intercepted German messages, a process sometimes termed "traffic analysis": from call signs, frequencies, times of interception and so forth, he was able to deduce a great deal of information about the structure of Nazi Germany's Kriegsmarine's communication networks and even about the structure of the German navy itself.

Hinsley helped initiate a programme of seizing Enigma machines and keys from German weather ships, such as the Lauenburg, thereby facilitating Bletchley Park's resumption of interrupted breaking of German Naval Enigma. He realised that, as the ships were on station for long periods, they would have to carry the code books (which changed every month) for subsequent months; these would likely be in a locked safe and might be overlooked when the crew threw Enigma materials (including the code book currently in use) overboard if the ship was boarded, an assumption which proved correct.

In late 1943, Hinsley was sent to liaise with the US Navy in Washington, with the result that an agreement was reached in January 1944 to co-operate in exchanging results on Japanese Naval signals.

Towards the end of the war, Hinsley, by then a key aide to Bletchley Park chief Edward Travis, was part of a committee which argued for a post-war intelligence agency that would combine both signals intelligence and human intelligence in a single organisation. In the event, the opposite occurred, with GC&CS becoming GCHQ.

On 6 April 1946, Hinsley married Hilary Brett-Smith, a graduate from Somerville College, Oxford, who had also worked at Bletchley Park, in Hut 8. They moved to Cambridge after the war where Hinsley had been elected a Fellow at St. John's College.

Hinsley was awarded the OBE in 1946 and was knighted in 1985.

On his death, Sir Harry Hinsley was cremated and his family buried the ashes privately in Cambridge.

== Historian ==
After the war, Hinsley returned to St John's College and lectured in history; in 1969, he was appointed Professor of the History of International Relations. From 1979 to 1989, he was Master of St John's College and, from 1981 to 1983, he was vice-chancellor of the University of Cambridge. In 1981 he was made an honorary fellow of Trinity College Dublin.

In 1962, Hinsley published Power and the Pursuit of Peace, which is important as a study of early idealist thought about international relations.

Hinsley edited the multi-volume official history British Intelligence in the Second World War and argued that Enigma decryption had speeded Allied victory by one to four years but had not fundamentally altered the war's outcome.

He was criticised by Marian Rejewski and Gordon Welchman, who took exception to inaccuracies in Hinsley's accounts of the history of Enigma decryption in the early volumes of his official history, including crucial errors in chronology. Subsequently, a revised account of the Polish, French and British contribution was included in Volume 3, Part 2.

The following volumes of British Intelligence in the Second World War were edited by Hinsley and published by Her Majesty's Stationery Office (HMSO) London:

- Volume 1: Its Influence on Strategy and Operations, F. H. Hinsley with E. E. Thomas, C. F. G. Ransome and R. C. Knight, (1979, HMSO) ISBN 0-11-630933-4
- Volume 2: Its Influence on Strategy and Operations, F. H. Hinsley with E. E. Thomas, C. F. G. Ransome and R. C. Knight, (1981, HMSO) ISBN 0-11-630934-2
- Volume 3, Part 1: Its Influence on Strategy and Operations, F. H. Hinsley with E. E. Thomas, C. F. G. Ransome and R. C. Knight, (1984, HMSO) ISBN 0-11-630935-0
- Volume 3, Part 2: Its Influence on Strategy and Operations, F. H. Hinsley with E. E. Thomas, C. A. G. Simkins, and C. F. G. Ransom, (1988, HMSO) ISBN 0-11-630940-7
  - Includes Bibliography (pages 961–974), and The Polish, French and British Contributions to the Breaking of the Enigma; a Revised Account (Appendix 30, pages 945–959).
- Volume 4: Security and Counter-Intelligence, F. H. Hinsley and C. A. G. Simkins, (1990, HMSO) ISBN 0-11-630952-0
- Abridged Version, F. H. Hinsley, (1993, HMSO) ISBN 0-11-630956-3 (& 1993, Cambridge University Press) ISBN 0-521-44304-0

Hinsley also co-edited (with Alan Stripp) and contributed to Codebreakers: The Inside Story of Bletchley Park, which contains personal accounts from those who worked at Bletchley Park.

The Hinsley Memorial Lecture, an annual lecture on an international relations topic, is held every year at St John's College in memory of Hinsley.

He is commemorated by a blue plaque on his birthplace in Walsall.

== Sources ==
- Erskine, Ralph; Smith, Michael, eds. (2011), The Bletchley Park Codebreakers, Biteback Publishing Ltd, ISBN 978-1-84954-078-0 Updated and extended version of Action This Day: From Breaking of the Enigma Code to the Birth of the Modern Computer Bantam Press 2001
- Kahn, David (1991). Seizing the Enigma, ISBN 0-395-42739-8.
- Langhorne, Richard (2004). "Hinsley, Sir (Francis) Harry (1918–1998)", in the Oxford Dictionary of National Biography.

Academic offices
Preceded by Nicholas Mansergh	Master of St John's College, Cambridge; 1979–1989	Succeeded by Robert Hinde
Preceded by Sir Peter Swinnerton-Dyer	Vice-Chancellor of the University of Cambridge; 1981–1983	Succeeded by John Butterfield, Baron Butterfield
