= Genista McIntosh, Baroness McIntosh of Hudnall =

British arts consultant, theatre executive and politician

The Right Honourable The Baroness McIntosh of Hudnall
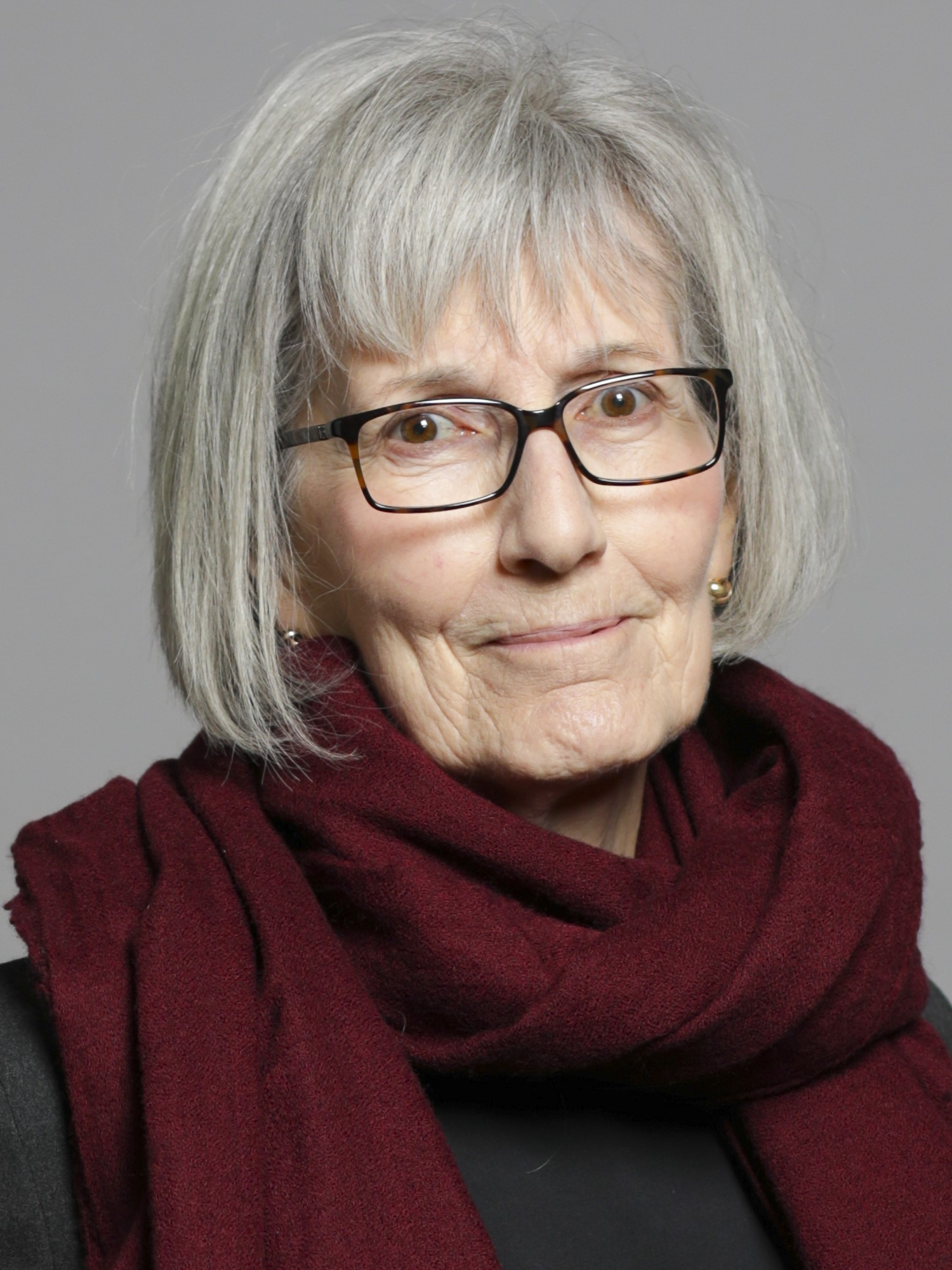
- Official portrait, 2020

Deputy Speaker of the House of Lords
- Incumbent
- Assumed office 29 November 2010

Member of the House of Lords
- Lord Temporal
- Life peerage 3 August 1999

Personal details
- Born: 23 September 1946 (age 80)
- Party: Labour

Genista Mary "Jenny" McIntosh, Baroness McIntosh of Hudnall (born 23 September 1946), is a British arts consultant, theatre executive and Labour politician.

Born Genista Mary Tandy, she was the daughter of Geoffrey Tandy and his wife Maire née MacDermott, and was educated at the University of York. In 1971 she married Neil Scott Wishart McIntosh. They had one son and a daughter, and were later divorced. McIntosh worked for the Royal Shakespeare Company as casting director between 1972 and 1977, as planning controller between 1977 and 1984, as senior administrator from 1986, and as associate producer in 1990. She was executive director of the Royal National Theatre from 1990 to 1996 and from 1997 to 2002. In 1997 she was appointed chief executive of the Royal Opera House, but resigned after five months due to ill health. She was made a life peer as Baroness McIntosh of Hudnall, of Hampstead in the London Borough of Camden on 3 August 1999 and made her maiden speech in the House of Lords in November of that year.
