= Phoebe Senyard =

Phoebe Gladys Senyard
- Born: 1891
- Died: 1983 (aged 91–92); London
- Occupation: Worked at Bletchey Park during WW II

Phoebe Gladys Senyard (1891-1983) was an employee of the British Foreign Office and worked at the country house and estate at Bletchley Park from 1939-1945. Her duties were primarily administrative and supervisory although she worked closely with several codebreakers. Bletchley Park was the primary place devoted to decrypting Axis military codes to provide intelligence aiding the war effort of the Allies. The success of Bletchley Park is estimated to have played an important role in the allied victory and to have shortened the war. In 1946, Senyard was appointed a Member of the Order of the British Empire (MBE). Given her secretive work, the MBE citation says only that she was "employed in a department of the Foreign Office." Senyard was one of several older women who provided experience and leadership to the mostly-young and mostly-female people working at Bletchley Park which eventually had a staff of about 9,000. Authors describe her background as "privileged" and "well-heeled."

Senyard was described by a young typist: "She was very pretty, a very good-looking woman. She seemed terribly old to me but she must have been in her forties. Very nice, very pleasant face, very confident, everybody liked her."

== Bletchley Park ==
In 1939 Senyard was a secretary in the Naval Section of the Government Code and Cypher School (GC&CS) in London. On August 15, anticipating that World War II would soon begin, Senyard and about 100 employees of GC&CS were ordered to report to Bletchley Park. Senyard protested, but was told that the deployment to Bletchley Park would only be for a fortnight. She was there for six years, the duration of the war.

The German sub-section of the Naval Section was initially housed in a corner of the countrys house's library. Senyard said she didn't understand what she was to be doing. She worked at a kichen table with another person and sorted intercepted German naval messages on the floor. Comforts were minimal. The chaotic situation improved after actor Frank Birch became the head of the German sub-section. The Naval Section at Bletchley Park expanded from a staff of four in 1939 to 76 by summer 1940 and by the end of the war had a staff of 900. In early 1940, the Naval Section moved to the newly-constructed Hut 4. Senyard commented that Hut 4 was freezing in the winter. In mid-1940, She was on the list of vital people at Bletchley who would be evacuated to Canada to continue work there if Germany invaded Great Britain. She was in charge of distributing to the proper people and offices all the messages decoded or arriving in Hut 4. She supervised a team of messengers to distribute the messages.

Harry Hinsley soon joined and became the head of the German sub-section of the Naval Section while Birch moved up to lead the whole Naval Section in 1940. Senyard seems to have been a mother figure for young Hinsley. She was enthusiastic about his work and his leadership. After the threat of German invasion subsided in late 1940, the greatest threat to Britain's survival was submarine attacks on merchant ships transporting food and other essentials from the United States and Canada. The job of the Naval Section was to pinpoint the location of German submarines by decoding radio traffic. Decoded information, source not revealed, was then passed on the Navy to enable cargo ships to elude the submarines and warships and airplanes to attack the submarines. Senyard was Frank Birch's personal assistant and later took the job of managing the Director's Secretariat. In that position she presided over the administrative and secretarial staff of the Naval Section, an unglamorous but necessary job given the competing priorities and diversity of people, civilians and military, working at the site. She is also known for hiring a chef from the Savoy Hotel to prepare good meals for the harried codebreakers. As the war continued and British rationing of food tightened, the quality of the food deteriorated to what one Bletchley employee called "watery cabbage and stale fat."

== Post war ==
Most of the people working at Bletchley Park were dismissed at the end of World War II. As a pre-war employee of GC&CS, Senyard continued her employment, living and working in the London metropolitan area. She lived in Croydon with her mother and brother Henry. She retired in 1951 and died in 1983, age 91. She never married.
