= Jasvinder Sanghera =

British author and campaigner (born 1965)

Dame Jasvinder Sanghera DBE
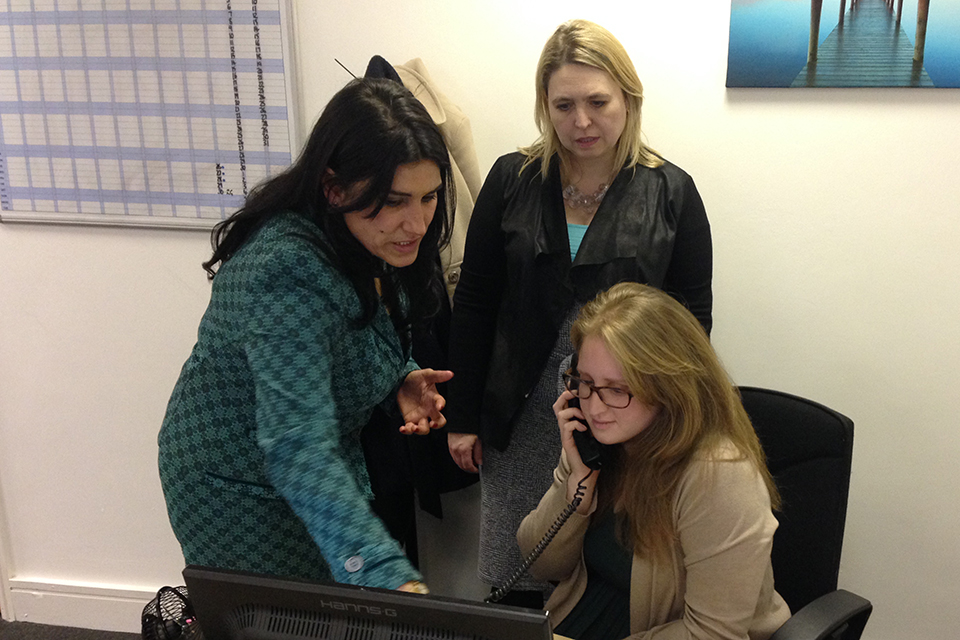
- Sanghera (left) in 2016
- Born: Jasvinder Kaur; September 1965 (age 60–61); Derby, England
- Occupation: Author
- Known for: Campaigning against forced marriages and abuse.
- Sanghera's voice from the BBC programme Desert Island Discs, 24 March 2013

Dame Jasvinder Kaur Sanghera, DBE (born Derby, England September 1965) is a British author and campaigner against forced marriages and abuse.

== Early life ==
Sanghera was born into a traditional Sikh Indian family. Her sisters were all forced to marry at ages as young as 15. Aged 14, she was told she was to marry an older man under an arranged marriage agreed upon when she was 8 years of age. At first she refused, and was locked in her room, but eventually regained more freedom by appearing to consent, and then was able to escape and live her own life, and was disowned by all her family, which never reconciled. She has two adult daughters and an adult son, and is a grandmother.

== Career ==
Her memoir Shame (2007) was a Times Top 10 Bestseller and described in the House of Lords as a "political weapon". She is widely recognised for publicising the problem of forced marriage. The then Prime Minister, David Cameron, said her work "turned my head on the issue of forced marriage". Her work is recognised as a key contributory factor to the creation of a specific UK forced-marriage criminal offence in 2014.

Sanghera is an expert witness in courts in child, civil and criminal proceedings. She is the Independent Chair of the Leeds Safeguarding Children Partnership and chair of Domestic Homicide Reviews. She was a member of the three-person Independent Safeguarding Board for the Church of England, until all three appointments were terminated by the Archbishops' Council in June 2023. She was awarded an honorary doctorate (HonDUniv) by the University of Derby in 2009. She was awarded The Pride of Britain Award in 2009 and was named Cosmopolitan Ultimate Woman of the Year in 2010. In 2011, she was listed in the Guardian’s top 100 Most Inspirational Women in the World and in 2012 received the Global Punjabi Award. In the 2013 Queen's Birthday Honours, she was appointed Commander of the Order of the British Empire (CBE) for services to victims of forced marriage and honour-based violence and promoted to a Dame Commander (DBE) in the same order in the 2024 Birthday Honours. In 2014, was awarded Legal Campaigner of the Year. Sanghera is also listed in the 2016 edition of Who's Who and in the same year received the International Woman Award for human rights from the Italian media. In 2018, she was awarded Honorary Doctor of Law by De Montfort University, Leicester and Woman of the Year by Leeds City Council and in 2019 she was awarded the Robert Burns Humanitarian of the Year Award and also the Sikh Woman of Substance Award.

== Publications ==
1. Shame ISBN 978-0340924600 (25 January 2007)
2. Daughters of Shame ISBN 978-0340997826 (6 August 2009)
3. Shame Travels (2011)
4. The Women Writers Handbook, Contributor. (2020) ISBN 978-1912430338 `
