= Hut 4 =

Part of Second World War UK government cypher school

Coordinates: 51.99633°N 0.74287°W

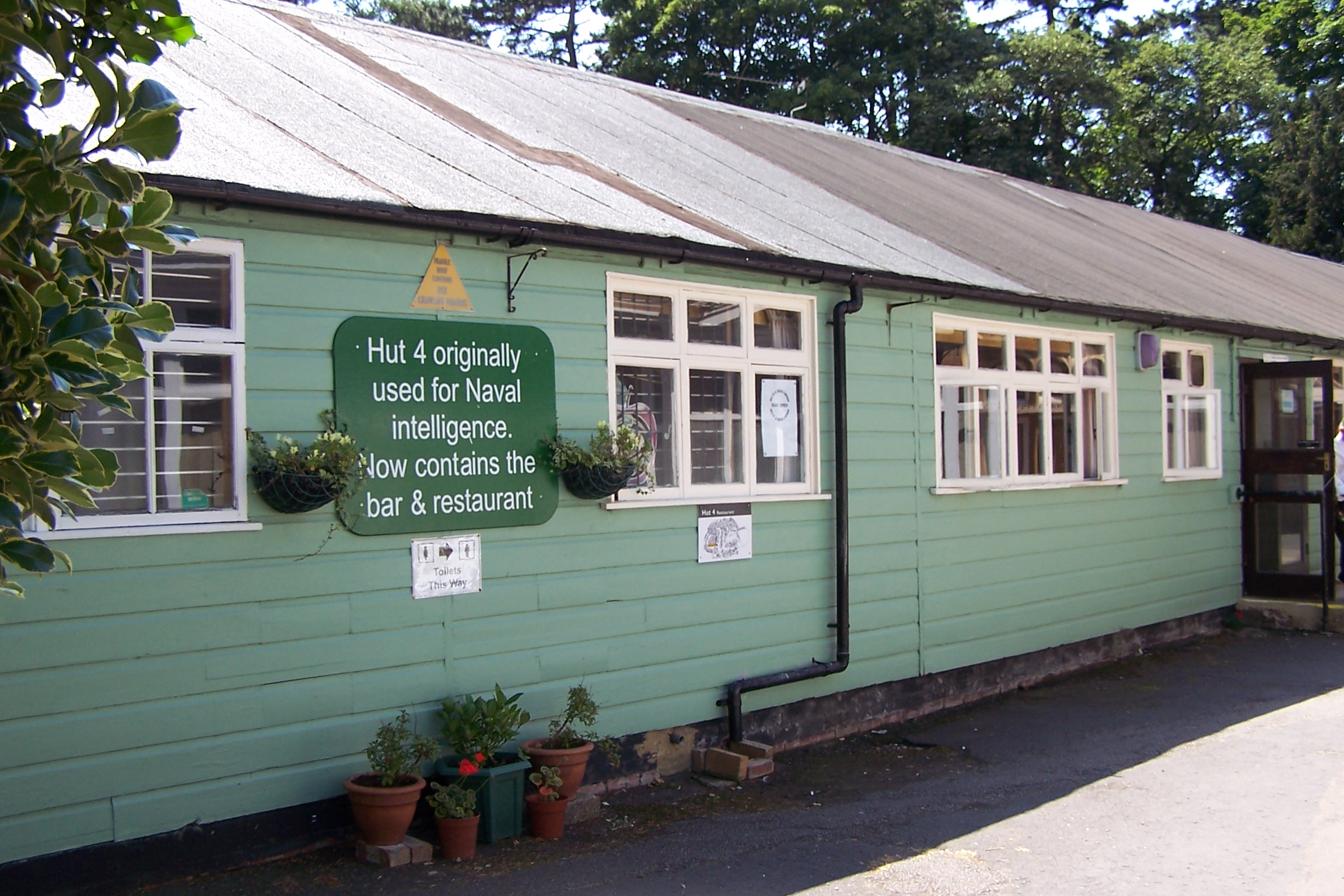
Hut 4, sited adjacent to the mansion, was used during wartime for naval intelligence. Today, it has been refurbished as a bar and restaurant for the museum

Hut 4 was a wartime section of the Government Code and Cypher School at Bletchley Park tasked with the translation, interpretation and distribution of Kriegsmarine (German navy) messages deciphered by Hut 8. The messages were largely encrypted by Enigma machines. As the Kriegsmarine operated Enigma more securely, Hut 8 had less information for Ultra than Hut 6 which handled Army and Air Force messages. Hut 4 also broke various hand cyphers and some Italian naval traffic.

== Location ==
Located initially in one of the original single-story wooden huts, the name "Hut 4" was retained when the section moved to a new brick building, Block A, in 1941.

== Operation ==
Naval Ultra was handled differently from Army and Air Force Ultra because the Admiralty was an operational HQ and could give orders during a battle; while the Imperial General Staff (Army) and Air Staff would give directives to theatre commanders general orders say to "clear the enemy out of Africa" with discretion over how to do it. Verbatim translations of naval decodes were sent to the Naval Intelligence Division (NID) of the Admiralty's Operational Intelligence Centre (OIC) in London and nowhere else (except for some naval intelligence sent directly from Bletchley to Commanders-in-Chief in the Mediterranean).

Hut 4 also decoded a manual system known as the "dockyard cipher". This sometimes carried messages that were also sent on an Enigma network. Feeding these back to Hut 8 provided excellent cribs for breaking the current naval Enigma key.

== People ==
- M. M. G. Jennings (Margaret Allan), racing driver
- J. W. B. Barns, later Professor of Egyptology at Oxford
- Sarah Baring, later Viscountess Astor
- Osla Benning, Prince Philip's first girlfriend
- Jocelyn Bostock from Lady Margaret Hall (LMH) Oxford, assistant to Hinsley
- Alec Naylor Dakin
- Leonard R. Palmer, later Professor of Comparative Philology at Oxford.
- Gwen Paxton
- Pamela Rose
- Phoebe Senyard, Foreign Office employee, administrator and supervisor, Personal assistant to Frank Birch
- Bernard Willson

Note: Frank Birch and Harry Hinsley were both associated with the naval section (Huts 4 & 8).

== Sources ==
- Asa Briggs Secret Days: Code-breaking in Bletchley Park (2011, Frontline Books, London) ISBN 978-1-84832-615-6
- Peter Calvocoressi Top Secret Ultra (1980, Cassell Ltd, London) ISBN 0-304-30546-4
